= Bosnian and Herzegovinan art =

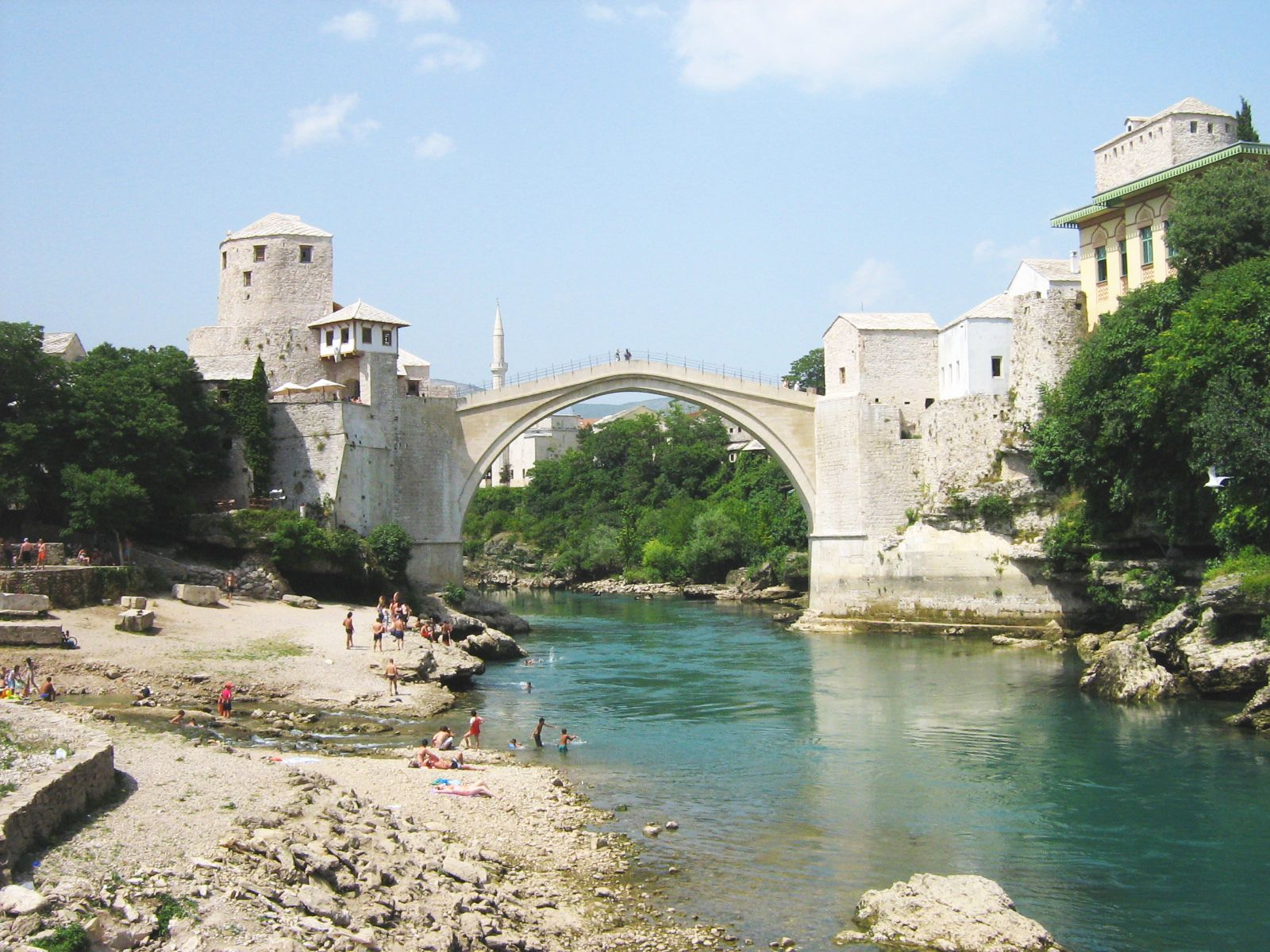
Stari Most (The Old Bridge) in Mostar, 1557. UNESCO World Heritage Site

The art of Bosnia and Herzegovina includes artistic objects created by the inhabitants of Bosnia and Herzegovina from prehistory to present times.

== Ancient heritage ==
=== Prehistory ===
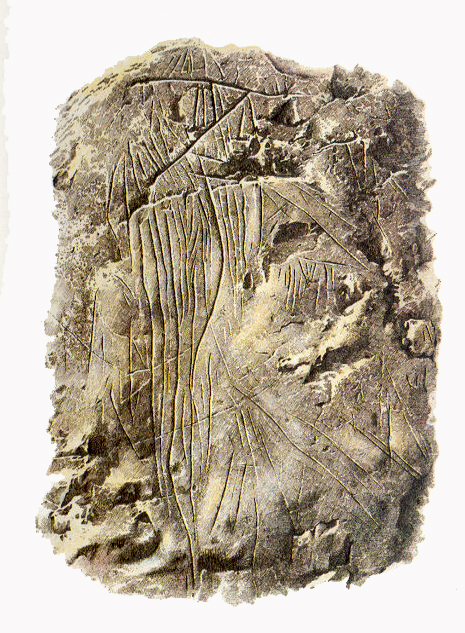
"Horse attacked by arrows", engraving in cave Badanj near Stolac, c. 14000 BC

Bosnia and Herzegovina hosts the oldest monument of the Paleolithic age in southeastern Europe, engravings in Badanj cave near Stolac in Herzegovina. The most famous engraving is the Horse attacked by arrows, preserved in fragments dated around 14000 - 12000 B.C.

During the time when Neolithic and Copper cultures were starting to appear, Mediterranean Panonian cultures began to mix. Herzegovina was highly influenced by the impresso ceramics from the Western Mediterranean, as seen in Green Cave near Mostar, Čairi near Stolac, Lisičići near Konjic and Peć Mlini near Grude.

In the upper regions of the Bosna river and the Northeastern parts of Bosnia (Obre I near Kakanj) the local culture was influenced by Adriatic cultures in the South and the Starčević culture in the Northeast. Original expressions of that culture are ceramic pots on four legs, called Rhyton. They are also found in the Danilo culture on the Croatian coast.

Because of these influences, Kakanj culture is considered part of a wide circle of Neolithic tribes that followed a cult of life force (from northern Italy, Dalmatia and Epirus to Aegean). Butmir culture near Sarajevo is distinctive with fine glazed ceramics and miscellaneous geometrical decorations, often spirals.

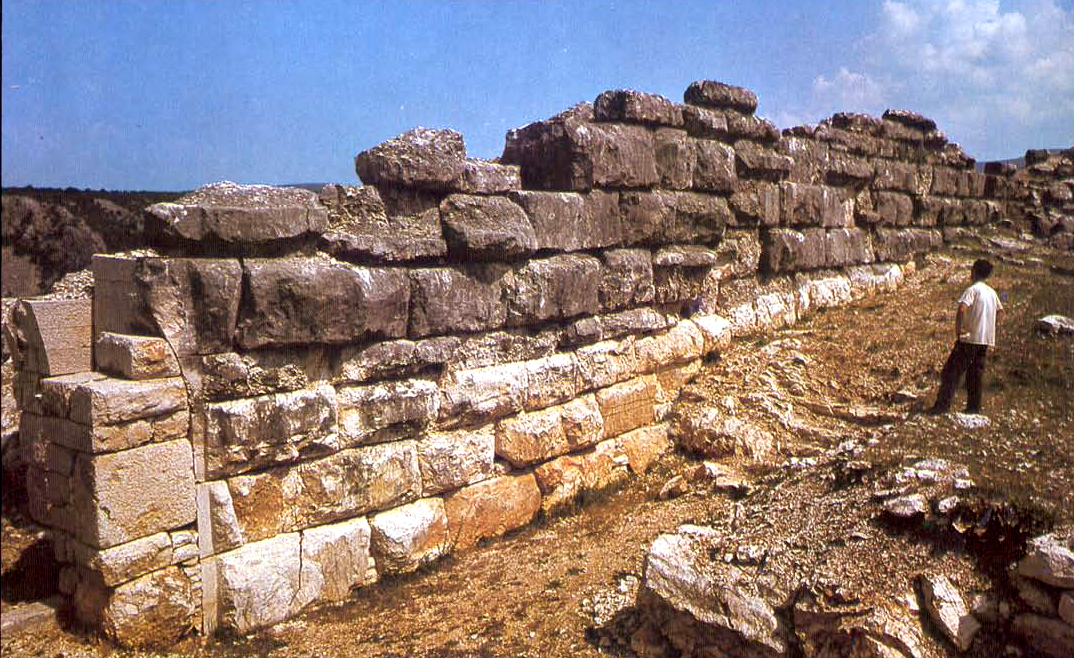
Monumental city walls of Daorson near Stolac, 4th century BC

From the 7th century BC onwards, bronze was replaced by iron, and only jewelry and art objects were still made out of bronze. The bronze culture of the Illyrians, an ethnic group with a distinct art form, started to organize itself in what is today Croatia, Serbia, Bosnia and Herzegovina. Different Illyrian tribes, under the influence of Halstat cultures from the North, formed original regional centers. With the notable exception of Pod near Bugojno in the upper valley of the Vrbas River, nothing is known of their settlements. In eastern Bosnia in the cemeteries of Belotić and Bela Crkva, the rites of inhumation and cremation are attested, with skeletons in stone cists and cremations in urns. Metal implements appear here side by side with stone implements. Most of the remains belong to the Middle Bronze Age. A very important role played their death cult, evidence of which is seen in their careful burials and burial ceremonies. Japodian tribes (found around Bihać) produced heavy, oversized necklaces out of yellow, blue or white glass paste, large bronze fibulas, as well as spiral bracelets, diadems and helmets out of bronze foils.

In the 4th century BC, the first Celts arrived in the region, bringing with them the technique of the pottery wheel, new types of fibulas and different bronze and iron belts. However, their influence on Bosnia and Herzegovina's art is negligible.

=== Antiquity ===
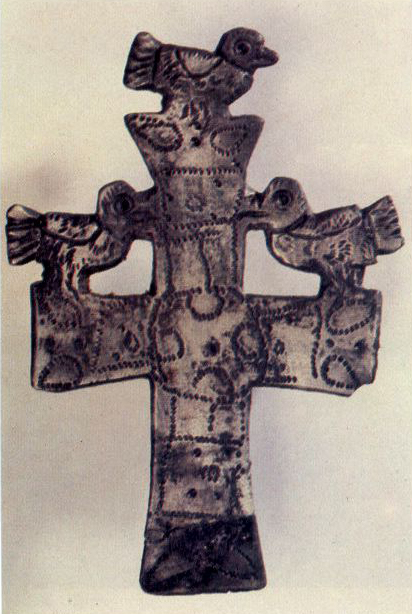
Silver fibula cross from 7th century found on Buško Blato lake in Herzegovina

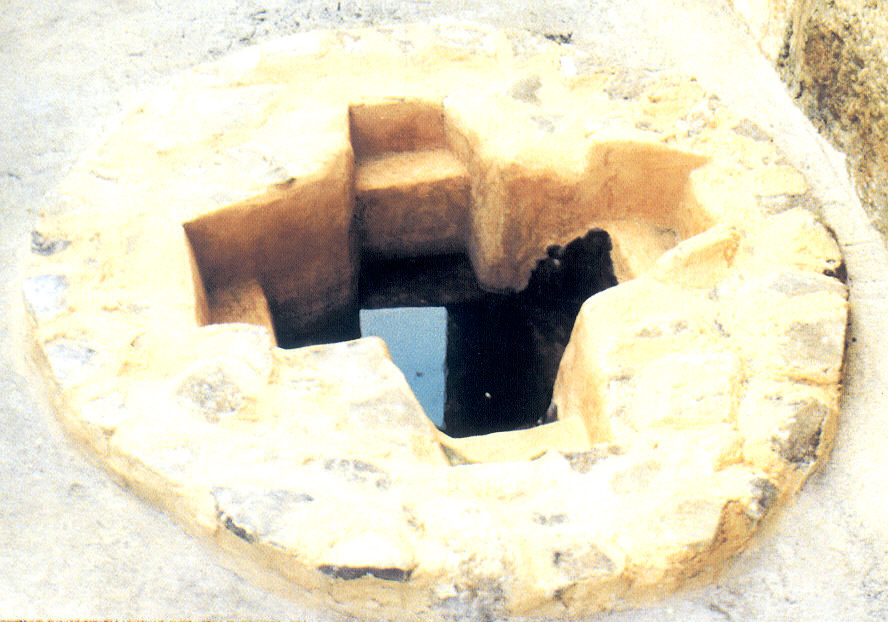
Stone baptistery from Drinovci near Grude, 4th century

The Neretva Delta in the South was heavily dominated by Hellenistic influences of the Daors, an Illyrian tribe who had their capital in Daorson near Stolac. Romans subdued the Illyrians in the first century BC, with the Illyrian provinces turning into provinces of Rome and Byzantium.

In Bosnia and Herzegovina, Romans built several small temples decorated with reliefs. They utilized Bosnia and Herzegovina's mineral deposits, particularly silver, to build military, civilian and industrial settlements. The complex of step sanctuary in Gradac near Posušje from year 184 AD had marble temple dedicated to recently deceased emperor Marcus Aurelius. Late Roman art in B&H is marked most dominantly expressed by the construction of villas, Christian mausoleums, basilicas and oratories like the Mausoleum in Šipovo near Jajce and Villa Mogorjelo near Čapljina as well as sculptures.

== Medieval art in Bosnia and Herzegovina ==
Stećak from Radimlja, 13th century

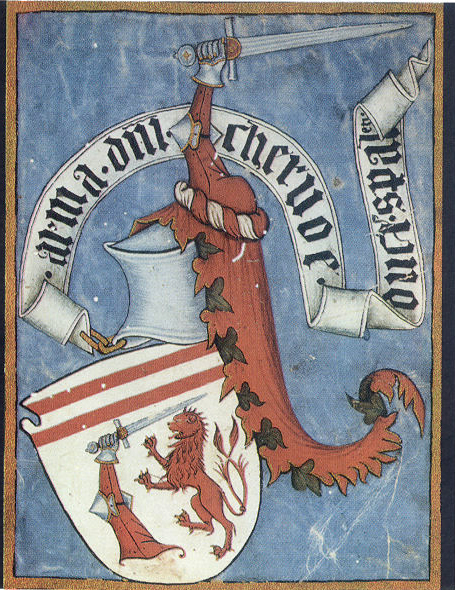
Illumination from Hrvoje's Missal, Split, 1404

In Bosnia and Herzegovina the Romanesque influence came from Croatia although it was never fully accepted and thus only adopted some elements from it.

Influences of Gothic art in the 14th century are represented by preaching orders and knightly culture. In Bosnian culture, religion and nobility were the main perpetuating factors.

From the earliest times of Bosnian Kingdom the nobility was buried in large necropolises near roads with graves marked by monumental tombstones (stećak). A Stećak was sometimes engraved with reliefs showing all sorts of motifs, from figurative to symbols, and sometimes writings in Bosnian Cyrillic. They are strongly linked to the Bosnian Church and most of the motifs are derived from its particular belief system, although some are also derived from Romanesque (crosses, arcades with semi-circular arches, son, half-moon etc.) and Gothic (arcades with sharp arches, knight riders, shields, swords, lilies etc.) art of the West.

The two most extraordinary examples of illuminated manuscripts from medieval Bosnia are Hval's missionary in Zagreb, a lavishly decorated manuscript with many miniatures. Misal Hrvoja Vukčića Hrvatinića - a liturgical book of the Bosnian duke and ruler of Dalmatia - Hrvoje Vukčić Hrvatinić, today in Istanbul, is colourfully painted with many details of knightly culture. Both were painted in Split, Croatia.

== Ottoman art in Bosnia and Herzegovina ==
In the 16th century, all of Bosnia was under Ottoman, extinguishing the Western influence of renaissance and later baroque art from the region. The only places where some Western art remained was in Franciscan monasteries in Visoko, Kreševo, Franciscan monastery in Fojnica, Franciscan monastery in Kraljeva Sutjeska etc.

However, the Ottoman period opened a new era in B&H art, that of Islamic Art which flourished until the 19th century. At that time three constant art traditions coexisted in B&H: Catholic-Western, Orthodox-Byzantine and the dominating Ottoman-Islamic one.

The Ottomans were quickly developing urban cities upon their conquest of B&H, enriched by Islamic and Byzantine influences. For example, in Foča in the 16th century, the Ottomans built 17 mosques, 29 public fountains, 6 public baths (hamam) and 13 caravanserai motels (han). Sarajevo is an example of a non-urban open city where the most important buildings are organized around one veining street, a čaršija (Persian chahar-su meaning all four sides). In Sarajevo the largest is famous Baščaršija with shops of 50 different crafts from the 15th century.

Islamic manuscripts, decorated in the Persian style with Islamic calligraphy, and many remain in Bosnian libraries to this day. In the 16th century, the Jews expelled from Spain came to Sarajevo, where they were allowed to settle. Beside their important influence on Bosnian culture, they brought with them a luxuriously decorated manuscript called Sarajevo Haggadah from the 14th century, which is now housed in the Sarajevo museum.

The bridge is an important part of Islamic art, not only because of the great skill required of an architect, but because of its symbolic meaning a mediator between Heaven and Earth. One of the most famous examples is the Old Bridge in Mostar, built by Hajredin, a pupil of the famous architect Mimar Sinan from Istanbul.

In Bosnian Islamic architecture, stone is reserved for religious, public buildings and fortifications, while private houses were built out of wood and ćerpić (native simple bonding material made of clay and straw). With often console constructions of the upper floors, these houses allowed for more open spaces and large windows. When the power of Ottomans started to descend in the middle of the 17th century, so did the influence of Islamic art in Bosnia and Herzegovina.

== Art in the Austro-Hungarian period ==
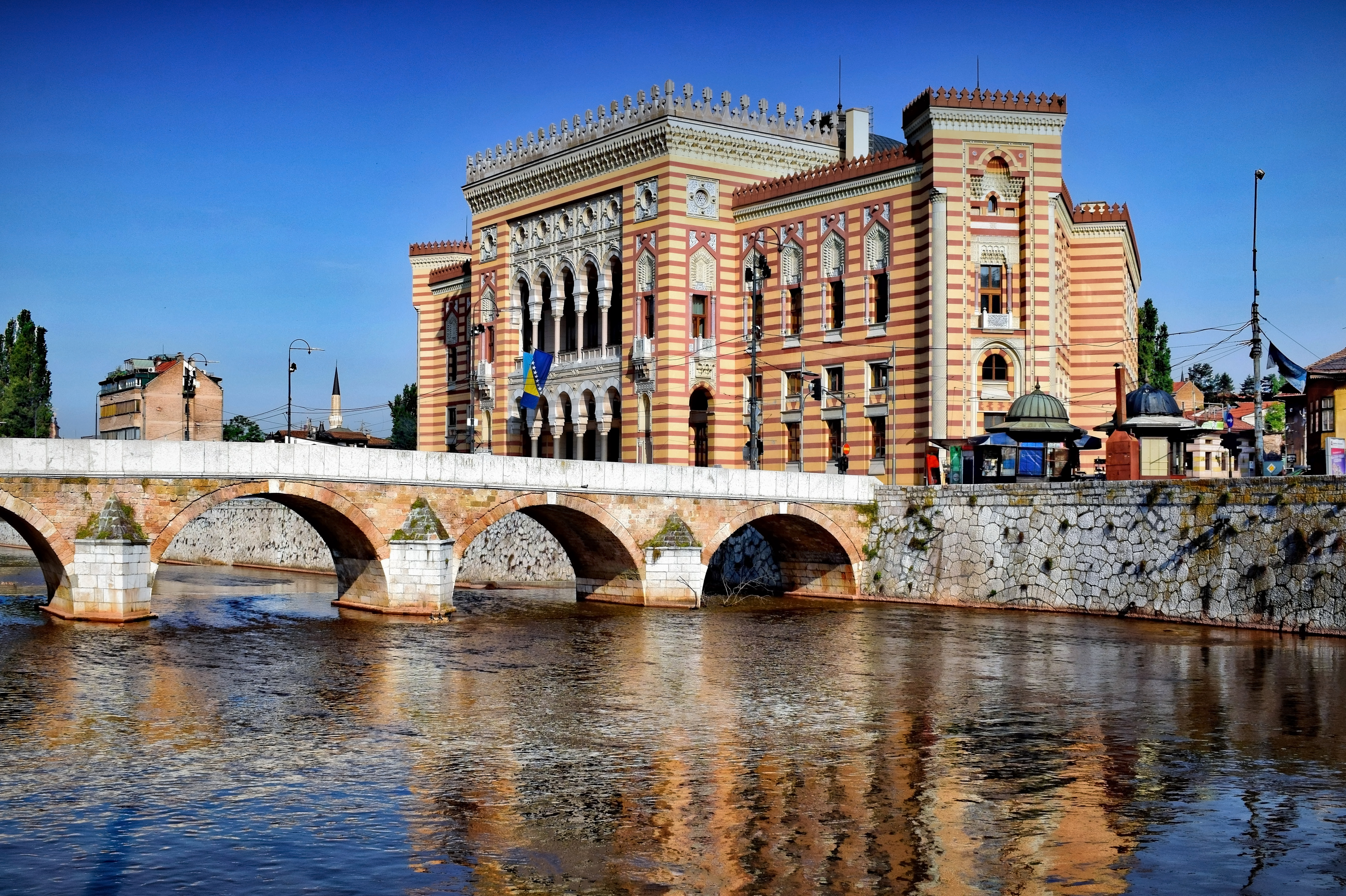
National Library in Sarajevo

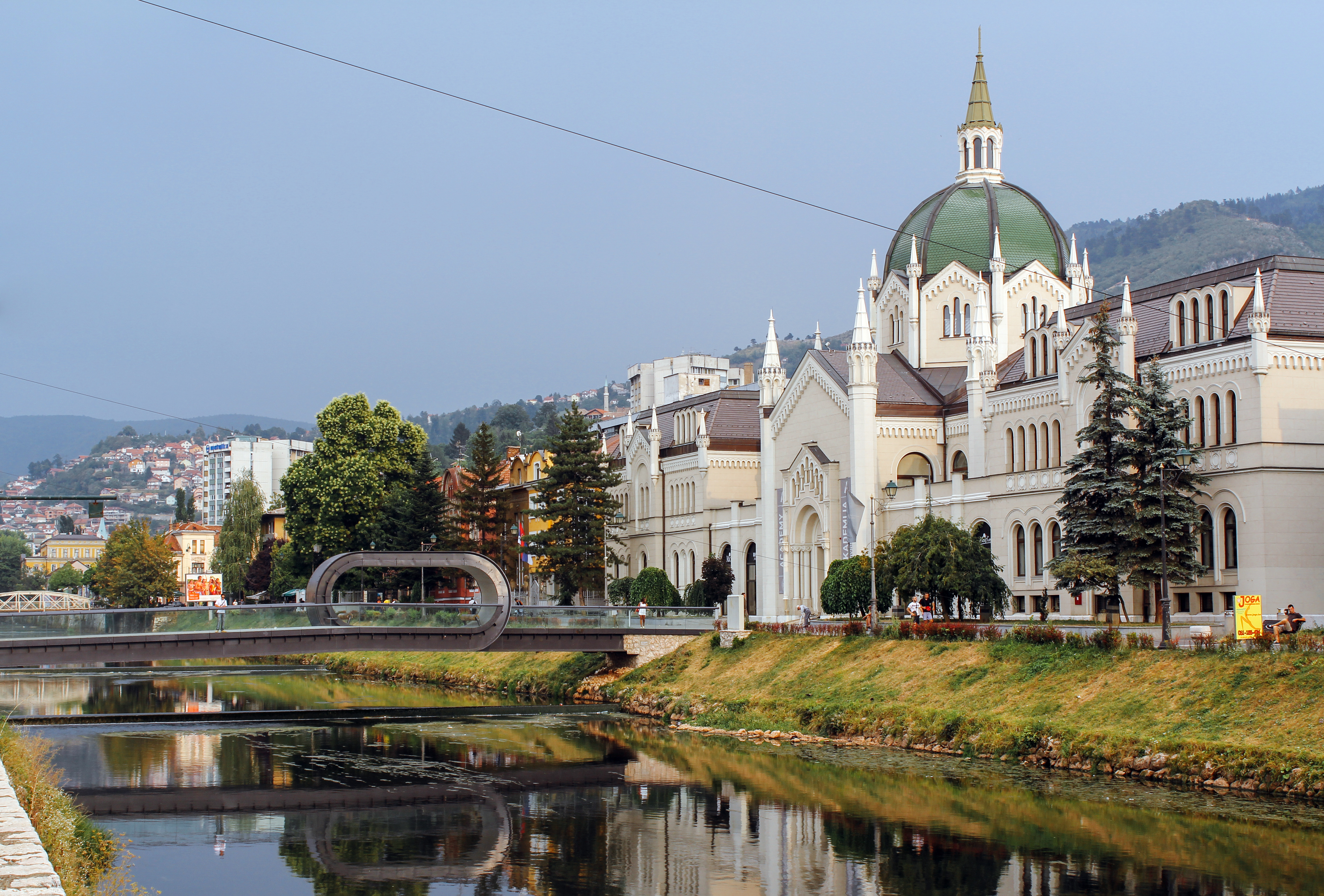
The Sarajevo Academy of Arts, on the bank of the Miljacka

After Bosnia became part of Austro-Hungarian, the region's art scene witnessed an intensification of activity as cities modernized and changed in structure. Architecture was dominated by eclectic pseudo styles like classicism, Neo-Renaissance, neo-baroque, and even Neo-Romanesque as well as neo-Gothic. A unique pseudo style is the“oriental eclectic” style (also referred to "Pseudo-Moorish style"), based on Moorish architecture found in Southern Spain and Egypt. The style contrasted markedly with the urban ambient of Bosnian cities at the time, as can be seen in Sarajevo (National Library and City Hall), Mostar Gymnasium and Travnik (Retirement Home).

The first Bosnian artists were educated in large European academies in Vienna, Munic, Prague, Kraków, Budapest and Paris, thanks to scholarships of cultural societies like Prosvjeta and Napredak. Artists like Atanasije Popović, Lazar Drljača, Gabrijel Jurkić, Branko Radulović, Petar Šain etc., are influenced by academism with slight touches of Impressionism, Art Nouveau, and pointillism. After the Great Exhibition of Bosnian Artists in 1917, the native born artists have prevailed. Modern styles that entered B&H were expressionism and Cézannes-ism.

== Art in the Yugoslavian Kingdom ==
After the end of World War I, the society of artists from SHS (state of Serbians, Croats and Slovenians) was created and held numerous exhibitions and artistic gatherings like the Blažuj colony of Vladimir Becić. Participants o were Roman Petrović and Jovan Bijelić, both with abstract proclivities, while Karlo Mijić was devoted to colouristic landscapes.

However, art production in B&H was severely restricted, leading many artists to never return to B&H from their studies in Zagreb and Beograd, while many were leaving the country. The first renewal happened with the "Group of Four" and "engaged art" of Roman Petrović and his circle, "The children of the Street". Mijić and Đoko Mazalić founded an art association called Krug (The Circle) with a strong focus on urban aesthetics of nature. Vojo Dimitrijević painted the Spain in 37, a representative artwork of colouristic expression with traces of Picasso and Chagall.

In the 1930s, architects were influenced by ideas of functionalism, humane architecture and Bauhaus. Those buildings were uniting function, content and form, without unnecessary plastic decoration, and with a simple rhythm of windows and modern constructions.

== Art in the Socialist Federal Republic of Yugoslavia ==
Right after World War II, Communist Yugoslavia was founded, which allowed artists to find a new expression through the themes of Revolution and War. Prominent representatives of this are Ismet Mujezinović and Branko Šotra. Architecture was also under the direct influence of Socialistic architecture, but never reached the monumentality of the original works.

In the 1950s, art slowly transformed to a more abstract outlook, based on industrial and economic motives. The first to do so was sculptor Mirko Ostoja who replaced classical modeling with iron welding. Even the Communist State changed its feeling toward modern art by commissioning large abstract monuments dedicated to famous battles in The War (Sutjeska, Kozara, Makljen etc.). Young architects gathered around Professor Juraj Neidhardt, and tried to connect modern architecture with B&H tradition and its surroundings. The result were buildings like The Mostar Mall, “Razvitak”, built in 1970 by A. Paljaga or the Jajce Mall in 1976 by R. Jadrić, Dž. Karić and N. Kurto.

In the 1960s many architects were leaving traditional boundaries and made important buildings in the manner of functionalism: The telecommunication building in Addis Abeba by Ivan Štraus and Zdravko Kovacević, or the Skenderija Hall in Sarajevo by Živorad Janković and Halid Muhasilović are exemplary.

In the 1970s, an art expression inspired by old Bosnian culture and tradition appeared in the graphic work of Dževad Hozo and in the paintings of Mehmed Zaimović, Seid Hasanefendić and Mersad Berber. Opposite to that, the urban expression of Ismar Mujezinović's works is more related to modern film montage and photo-optics, while Braco Dimitrijević was a Conceptual artist who worked mainly outside B&H.

An example of architecture in the 1980s is the Holiday Inn Hotel built in 1983 and the Unis Twin Towers built in Sarajevo in 1986, designed by Ivan Štraus.

== Art after the Bosnian War ==
Avaz Twist Tower 2009

Cultural preservation is under way in Bosnia and Herzegovina which can be seen with the most recent reconstruction of Stari Most in Mostar and many other structures of cultural and historical significance which were damaged or destroyed in the war.

Commercial construction in the years following the Bosnian War has seen a boom in Sarajevo. Sarajevo is one of the cities with the most construction in southeastern Europe. The Unis Twin Towers have been renovated completely. On the site of the former Oslobodjenje Towers, the Avaz towers have now been constructed. In the Hrasno residential area, the Bosnian Company Bosmal has constructed the Bosmal City Center, which includes the tallest set of twin towers in the Balkans at 120 meters each.

The Avaz Twist Tower located in Marijin Dvor, Sarajevo, is the tallest tower in Bosnia and Herzegovina. It is the new headquarters for Avaz, the most popular Bosnia and Herzegovina newspaper company.

== See also ==
- Culture of Bosnia and Herzegovina
