= List of painters from Bosnia and Herzegovina =

This is a list of notable painters from, or associated with, Bosnia and Herzegovina.

== B ==
- Mersad Berber (1940–2012)

== D ==
- Braco Dimitrijević (born 1948)
- Vojo Dimitrijević (1910–1980)
- Lazar Drljača (1881–1970)

== H ==
- Kosta Hakman (1899–1961)

== J ==
- Gabrijel Jurkić (1886–1974)

== K ==
- Daniel Kabiljo (1894–1944)
- Kristian Kreković (1901–1985)
- Maya Kulenovic (born 1975) (Canada)

== M ==
- Svetislav Mandić (1921–2003)
- Karlo Mijić (1887–1964)
- Ksenia Milicevic (born 1942) (France)

== O ==
- Daniel Ozmo (1912–1942)

== P ==
- Slobodan Pejić (1944–2006)
- Roman Petrović (1896–1947)

== S ==
- Petar Šain (1885–1965)
- Todor Švrakić (1882–1931)

== T ==
- Nesim Tahirović (1941–2020)

== Z ==
- Safet Zec (born 1943)

== See also ==
- List of Bosnian and Herzegovinian people
