= Culture of Bosnia and Herzegovina =

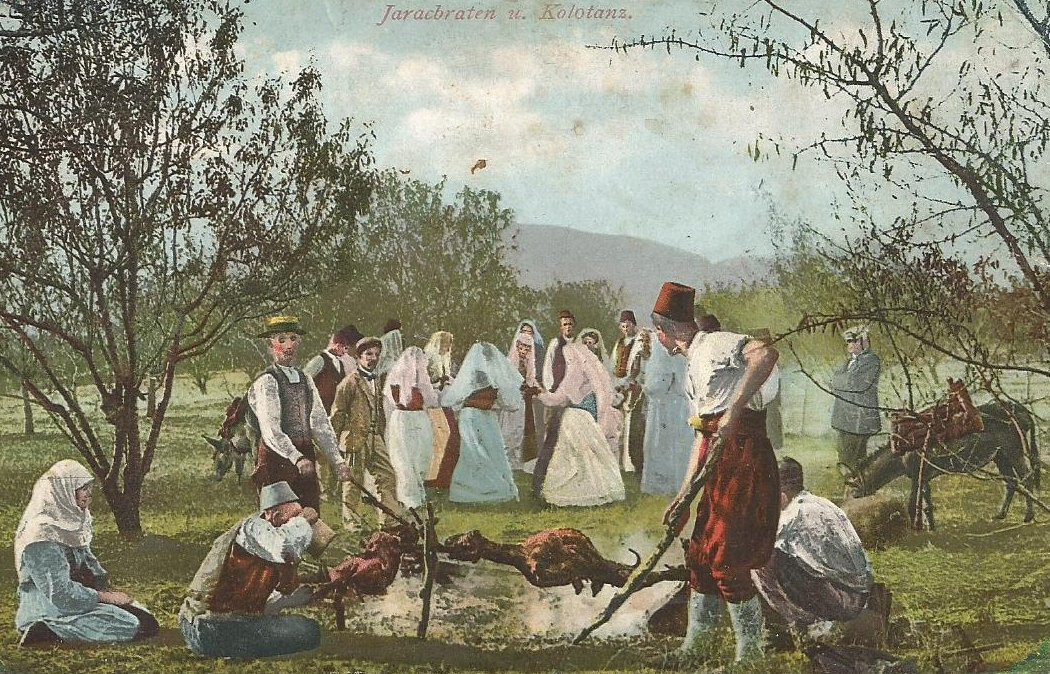
A lamb roast and "kolo" (circle) dancing - Bosnia and Herzegovina, 1895

The culture of Bosnia and Herzegovina encompasses the country's ancient heritage, architecture, science, literature, visual arts, music, cinema, sports and cuisine.

== Ancient cultural heritage ==
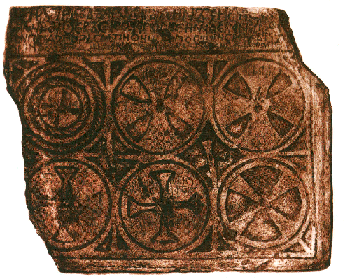
Kulin Ban's plate found in Biskupići, near Visoko.

The rock-carving by an artist found in Badanj Cave near the city of Stolac dates back to Paleolithic times (c. 12,000 and 16,000 BCE). It represents the death of a horse under a rain of arrows. It is the oldest Paleolithic finding in southeast Europe. There is also a rich legacy of Neolithic culture in Bosnia and Herzegovina. Particularly beautiful items have been found in Butmir near Sarajevo (5000 BC). During the Bronze Age, the territory of Bosnia and Herzegovina was occupied by Illyrian tribes such as the Japods in Bihać and the Daors in Daorson, near Stolac. They were directly influenced by the Greeks, as seen in Daorson especially. The Illyrians were conquered by the Romans, who left roads, bridges, and beautiful villas with mosaics all over Bosnia and Herzegovina. The best preserved examples are at Mogorjelo near Čapljina and the mosaics at Stolac (dating from the 3rd century). The Christian basilica are found throughout the country (Zenica, Visoko, Mostar, Široki Brijeg), and their carved stone stonework influenced the first original medieval Bosnian art, found on tombstones – stećak.

The Charter of Ban Kulin is the symbolic birth certificate of Bosnia's statehood, as it is the first written document that refers to Bosnia's borders (between the rivers of Drina, Sava and Una) and the elements of the Bosnian state - the ruler, throne and political organization. It is written in Bosnian Cyrillic and it also referred to the people of Bosnia - Bosnians. The Charter was a trade agreement between Bosnia and the Republic of Dubrovnik.

The most important item in the National Museum in Sarajevo is the Sarajevo Haggadah, a Jewish illuminated codex originally from 12th century Spain. Other important items include Hrvojev's mass (Hrvojev misal) and Hval's Codex (Hvalov zbornik), both Bosnian books of liturgy produced in Croatia at the start of the 15th century, a 16th-century Kur’an and Leontiev's New Testament (Leontijevo četverojevanđelje).

== Architecture ==
After the Ottoman conquest of Bosnia and Herzegovina, urban and city development flourished as the Ottomans brought imperial Islamic architecture to the region, partly mixed with local customs (one of them being the use of squinches instead of triangular pendentives found in Turkey). Many mosques and buildings were designed at the beginning. Afterwards, local merchants had more influence and in the 18th and 19th century, there was a rise in European influence. Moorish architecture developed during Austro-Hungarian occupation.

During the Royal Yugoslav period, Bosnia and Herzegovina remained at the margin of interwar architectural modernism in Yugoslavia. Immediately following the Second World War, Yugoslavia's brief association with the Eastern Bloc ushered in a short period of socialist realism, which came to an abrupt end with the 1948 Tito–Stalin Split. In the following years, modernist architecture came to symbolize the nation's break from the USSR (a notion that later diminished with growing acceptability of modernism in the Eastern Bloc).

== Science ==
The Academy of Sciences and Arts of Bosnia and Herzegovina is the country's highest scientific and artistic institution. Initially founded in 1951 as the Scientific Society of Bosnia and Herzegovina, it was upgraded to an academy in 1966.

The National Museum of Bosnia and Herzegovina opened in 1888; it undertook Bosnia's first systematic excavations of archeological sites from 1899 to 1904.

== Literature ==
Bosnia and Herzegovina has a rich literary heritage. Matija Divković, Bosnian Franciscan and writer is considered to be the founder of the modern literature of Bosnia and Herzegovina.

Notable poets include Antun Branko Šimić, Aleksa Šantić, Jovan Dučić and Mak Dizdar. Prominent prose writers include the Nobel Literature Prize laureate Ivo Andrić, Meša Selimović, Zaim Topčić, Zlatko Topčić, Branko Ćopić and Skender Kulenović. Contemporary writers include Semezdin Mehmedinović, Aleksandar Hemon, Miljenko Jergović, Abdulah Sidran, Nedžad Ibrišimović, and Marko Tomaš.

The National Theater was founded in 1919 in Sarajevo and its first director was famous playwright Branislav Nušić. Magazines such as Novi Plamen, Most and Sarajevske sveske are some of the more prominent publications covering cultural and literary themes.

== Visual arts ==
The visual arts in Bosnia and Herzegovina were always evolving and ranged from the original medieval tombstones (stećak) to paintings in Kotromanić court. However, it was the Austro-Hungarian occupation in 1878 that led to the renaissance of Bosnian painting. The first artists trained in European academies emerged at the beginning of the 20th century. These included Gabrijel Jurkić, Petar Tiješić, Karlo Mijić, Špiro Bocarić, Petar Šain, Đoko Mazalić, Roman Petrović and Lazar Drljača. Their generation was succeeded by artists such as Ismet Mujezinović, Vojo Dimitrijević, Ivo Šeremet and Mica Todorović.

Prominent artists in the post-World War II period include Virgilije Nevjestić, Bekir Misirlić, Ljubo Lah, Meho Sefić, Franjo Likar, Mersad Berber, Ibrahim Ljubović, Dževad Hozo, Affan Ramić, Safet Zec, Ismar Mujezinović, and Mehmed Zaimović. The Ars Aevi museum of contemporary art in Sarajevo includes works by artists renowned worldwide.

== Music ==
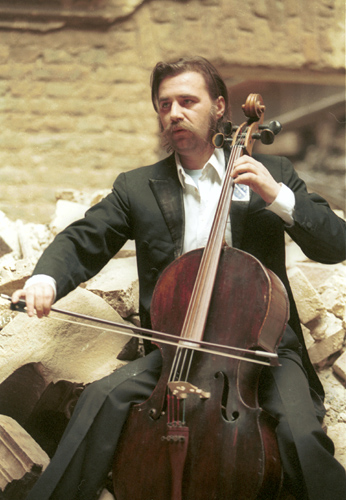
Vedran Smailović, the cellist of Sarajevo.

The most popular traditional Bosnian and Herzogovinian song forms of relatively recent origin (early 20th century) are the Bosnian root music (played with "šargija"), ganga, the rera and the ojkavica (oja-noja). Other popular surviving forms from the Ottoman era is the sevdalinka.

Pop music and rock music are traditionally popular too, represented by famous musicians including Goran Bregović, Davorin Popović, Kemal Monteno, Zdravko Čolić, Johnny Štulić, Edo Maajka, Dino Merlin and Tomo Miličević. Talented composers include Đorđe Novković, Esad Arnautalić, Kornelije Kovač, and the many pop and rock bands, e.g. Bijelo Dugme, Indexi, Zabranjeno Pušenje, include some of the leading groups from the era of the former Yugoslavia.

Bosnia is home to the composer Dušan Šestić, creator of the current national anthem of Bosnia and Herzegovina and father of singer Marija Šestić, and the pianist Sasha Toperich.

== Cinema ==
Notable Bosnian directors, screenwriters and producers are Zlatko Topčić, Mirza Idrizović, Aida Begić, Ivica Matić, Danis Tanović, Hajrudin Krvavac, Ademir Kenović, Benjamin Filipović, Ahmed Imamović, Pjer Žalica, Jasmila Žbanić, Dino Mustafić and Srđan Vuletić.

Sarajevo Film Festival, founded in 1995, has become the biggest and most influential in southeast Europe.

== Sports ==
=== Olympics ===
The most important international sporting event in the history of Bosnia and Herzegovina was the hosting of the 1984 Winter Olympics, held in Sarajevo from the 8th to 19 February 1984.

==== Sitting volleyball ====
Bosnia and Herzegovina national sitting volleyball team is the most decorated team representing Bosnia and Herzegovina. The team won 2 Paralympics Gold medals (2004 and 2012) and multiple World and European sitting volleyball titles. Many of the players lost limbs in the 1992–1995 Bosnian War.

=== Popular sports ===
==== Athletics ====
Bosnia and Herzegovina has produced many prominent athletes, including members of the Yugoslav national team before Bosnia and Herzegovina's independence. The nation's most notable track and field athlete since independence is runner Amel Tuka, who took the bronze medal in the 800 metres at the 2015 World Athletics Championships and the silver medal in the 800 metres at the 2019 World Athletics Championships.

==== Football (soccer) ====
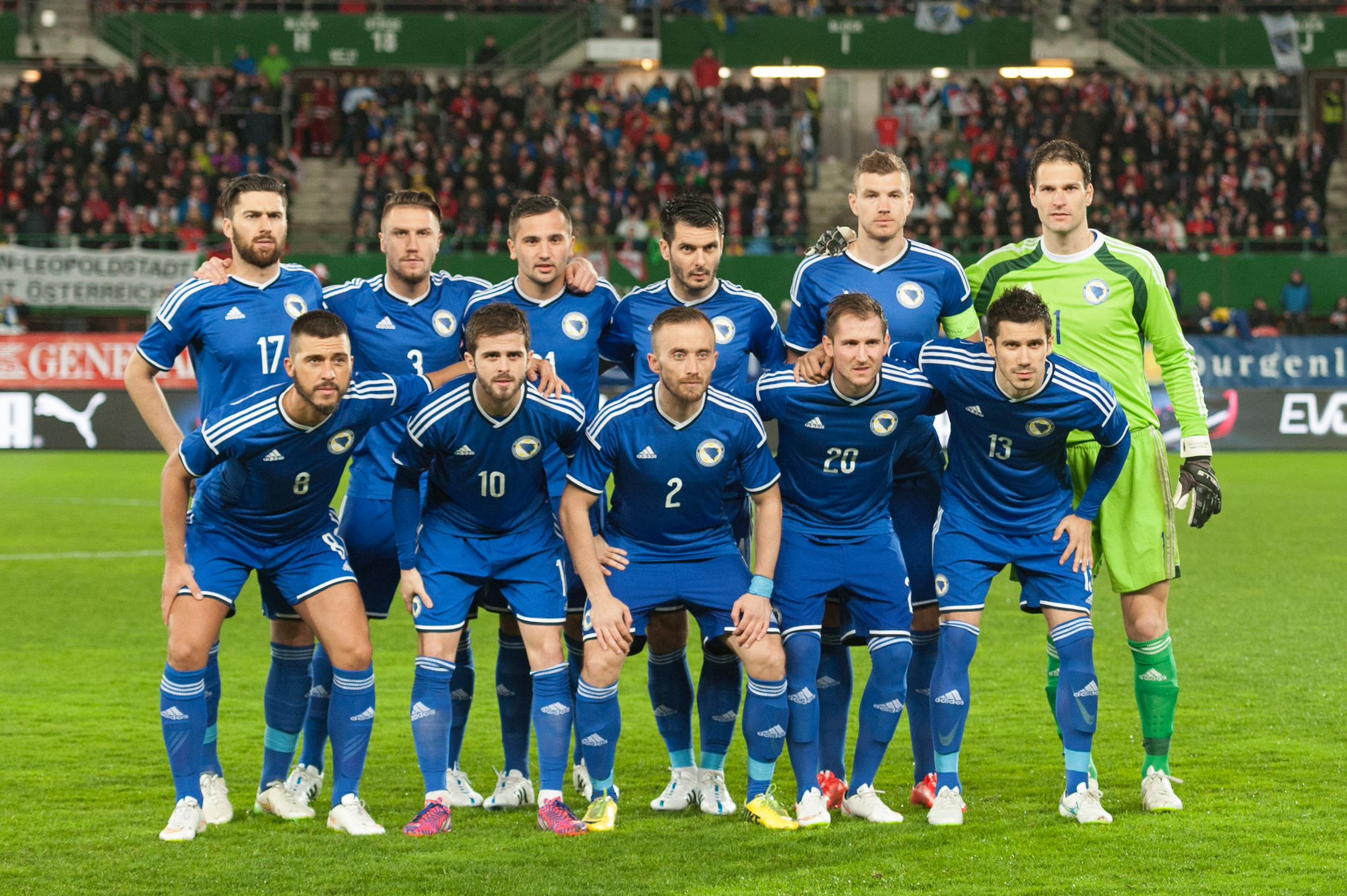
Bosnia and Herzegovina national football team, 2016

Football is the most popular sport in B&H. It dates from 1903 but its popularity grew significantly after World War II. In the pre-independence era Sarajevo (1967 and 1984) and Željezničar (1972) both won the Yugoslavian Championship title. The former Yugoslav national football team included a number of Bosnian players, such as Josip Katalinski, Dušan Bajević, Miroslav Blažević, Ivica Osim, Safet Sušić, and Mirsad Fazlagić.

Since independence the Bosnia and Herzegovina national football team has failed to qualify for any European or World Championship tournament, up until 2014 FIFA World Cup, after winning eight games to secure their place after many years of failed attempts of making their FIFA debut. Bosnian national teams have struggled to field the best eligible team as many players born in Bosnia and Herzegovina choose to play for other countries for reasons of ethnic identification and because of the higher salaries offered by other teams (for example: Mario Stanić and Mile Mitić were both born in Bosnia but play for Croatia and Serbia respectively; other internationally famous players from Bosnia and Herzegovina who have made similar choices include Zoran Savić, Vladimir Radmanović, Zoran Planinić, Aleksandar Nikolić and Savo Milošević).

==== Basketball ====
Bosnian basketball club, KK Bosna from Sarajevo were European Champions in 1989. The Yugoslav national basketball team, medal-winners in every world championship from 1963 through 1990, included Bosnian players such as Dražen Dalipagić and Mirza Delibašić. Bosnia and Herzegovina regularly qualifies for the Eurobasket championship. The Jedinstvo Women's basketball club, based in Tuzla, won the 1979 European Championships in Florence.

==== Boxing ====
The middle-weight boxer Marjan Beneš has won several B&H Championships, Yugoslavian Championships and the European Championship. In 1978, he won the World Title against Elish Obeda from Bahamas. Another middle-weight, Ante Josipović, won the Olympic gold medal in Los Angeles in 1984. He also won the Yugoslavian Championship in 1982, the Championship of the Balkans in 1983 and the Beograd Trophy in 1985. Felix Sturm aka Adnan Catic is a German former middleweight champion boxer with Bosnian origin. He has a Bosnian flag in his weardrobe and often holdes tales in Bosnian after a boxing match.

==== Chess ====
The Bosnian chess team has been Champion of Yugoslavia seven times, in addition to winning four European championships: 1994 in Lyon, 1999 in Bugojno, 2000 in Neum, and 2001 in Kalitea. The Borki Predojević chess club (from Teslić) has also won two European Club Championships, at Litohoreu (Greece) in 1999, and Kalitei (Greece) in 2001.

==== Handball ====
The Borac handball club, seven times Yugoslav National Championship winners, won the European Championship Cup in 1976 and the International Handball Federation Cup in 1991.

==== Karate ====
The Tuzla-Sinalco karate club from Tuzla was the most prolific Yugoslav championship-winning team, also winning four European Championships and one World Championship.

== Cuisine ==
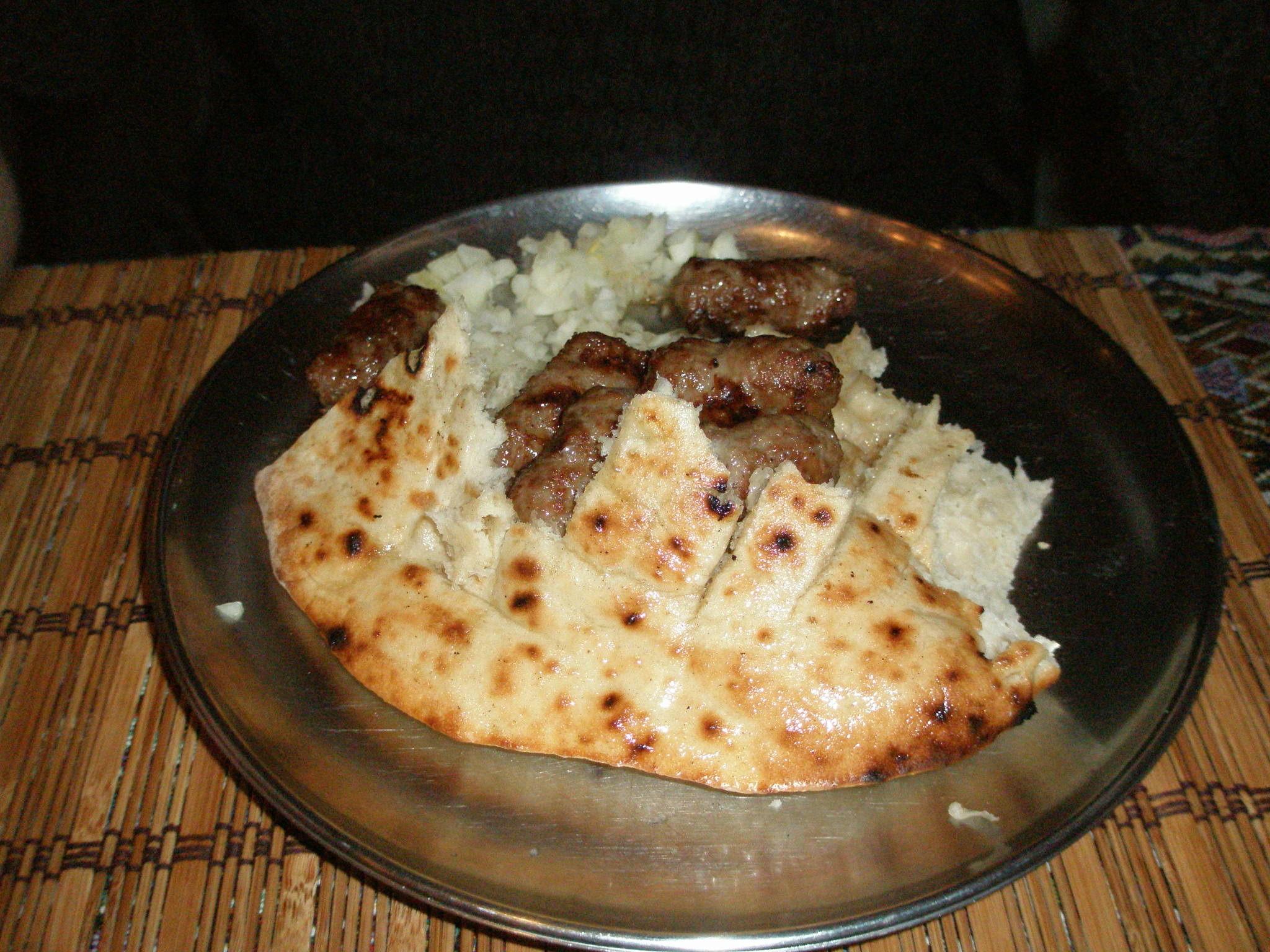
Bosnian ćevapi with onions in a somun.

Bosnian cuisine reflects a balance of Western and Eastern influences. Due to almost 500 years of Ottoman rule, Bosnian food is closely related to Turkish, Greek, and other former Ottoman and Mediterranean cuisines. However, years of Austrian rule can be detected in the many influences from Central Europe. Bosnian cuisine uses many spices, but usually in very small quantities. Most dishes are light, as they are boiled; the sauces are completely natural, consisting of little more than the natural juices of the vegetables in the dish. Typical ingredients include tomatoes, potatoes, onions, garlic, peppers, cucumbers, carrots, cabbage, mushrooms, spinach, courgettes, dried beans, fresh beans, plums, milk, and cream called pavlaka. Typical meat dishes include primarily chicken, beef and mutton. Some local specialties are ćevapi, burek, dolma, sarma, pilaf, goulash, ajvar and an extensive range of Eastern sweets. The best local wine comes from the southern region of the country, Herzegovina, where the climate is particularly suitable for growing grapes. Plum or apple rakia is distilled in the northern region of Bosnia.

== See also ==
- Architecture of Bosnia and Herzegovina
- List of libraries in Bosnia and Herzegovina
- List of National Monuments of Bosnia and Herzegovina
- List of World Heritage Sites in Bosnia and Herzegovina
- List of Museums in Bosnia and Herzegovina
- Folklore of Sarajevo
- Tourism in Bosnia and Herzegovina

== Sources ==
- Čuvalo, Ante (2010). The A to Z of Bosnia and Herzegovina. Rowman & Littlefield. ISBN 978-0-81087-647-7.
