= Todor Švrakić =

Bosnian painter (1882–1931)

Todor Švrakić (1882–1931) was a Bosnian Serb painter. He was one of the early 20th century pioneers of Bosnian painting within the European style and is considered one of the Western Balkans' most notable watercolor artists.

== Biography ==
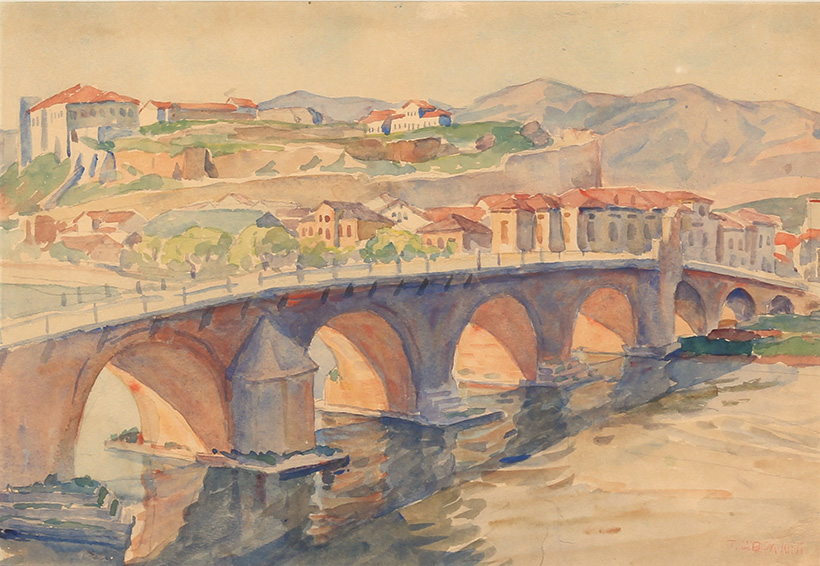
Tzar Stefan Dušan's bridge, 1919

Švrakić was born in Prijedor. His father, a carpenter, initially apprenticed Švrakić to a tailor, but his interest in painting took Švrakić, aged 16, to Belgrade, where he studied at Risto Vukanović's private painting school. He went on to study at the art academy in Vienna under Pavle Paja Jovanović. He subsequently gained a scholarship to the Academy of Fine Arts in Prague.

Following his return to Bosnia, he became one of Bosnia's most prominent artists and foremost aquarellists. Prof. Ahmed Burić, dating the beginnings of Bosnian painting back to Bosnia's occupation by the Austro-Hungarian Empire in 1878, mentions Todor Švrakić, along with Gabrijel Jurkić, Lazar Drljača and Petar Šain, as one of the first modern Bosnian artists. Along with Pero Popović, Karlo Mijić, and Branko Radulović, he was one of Bosnia's first academically-trained artists. Conservative in outlook, they opted for a naturalistic style, with an inclination for ethnographic subjects, but they opened up the way for the next generation of more innovative artists.

In 1907 Popović, Radulović and Švrakić exhibited in one of the two exhibitions that year that marked the beginnings of the modern painting tradition in Bosnia.

He exhibited his artworks as a part of Kingdom of Serbia's pavilion at International Exhibition of Art of 1911.

During World War I several war artists were wounded, captured and interned in prison camps in Hungary, Austria, and Romania, notably Todor Švrakić and Nikola Džanga were among them. Luckily, both survived the ordeal to continue with their respective careers.

The Kozara Museum in Prijedor owns a number of Švrakić's pictures and in 2010 hosted an exhibition of his work commemorating the hundredth anniversary of Švrakić's own 1910 exhibition in Prijedor.

Švrakić died in Sarajevo in 1931.

== See also ==
- Art of Yugoslavia
- War artists
