= Slavko Brill =

Croatian sculptor

- Born: 27 December 1900; Nova Gradiška, Kingdom of Croatia-Slavonia, Austria-Hungary
- Died: January 1943 (aged 42); Jasenovac, Independent State of Croatia
- Occupation: Sculptor
- Spouse: Alice Brill (m. 1933; died 1942)

Slavko Brill (27 December 1900 – January 1943) was a Croatian-Jewish sculptor and ceramics artist born in Nova Gradiška.

He graduated in 1926 at Art Academy in Zagreb. His artistic works included portraits, busts, and cemetery monuments.

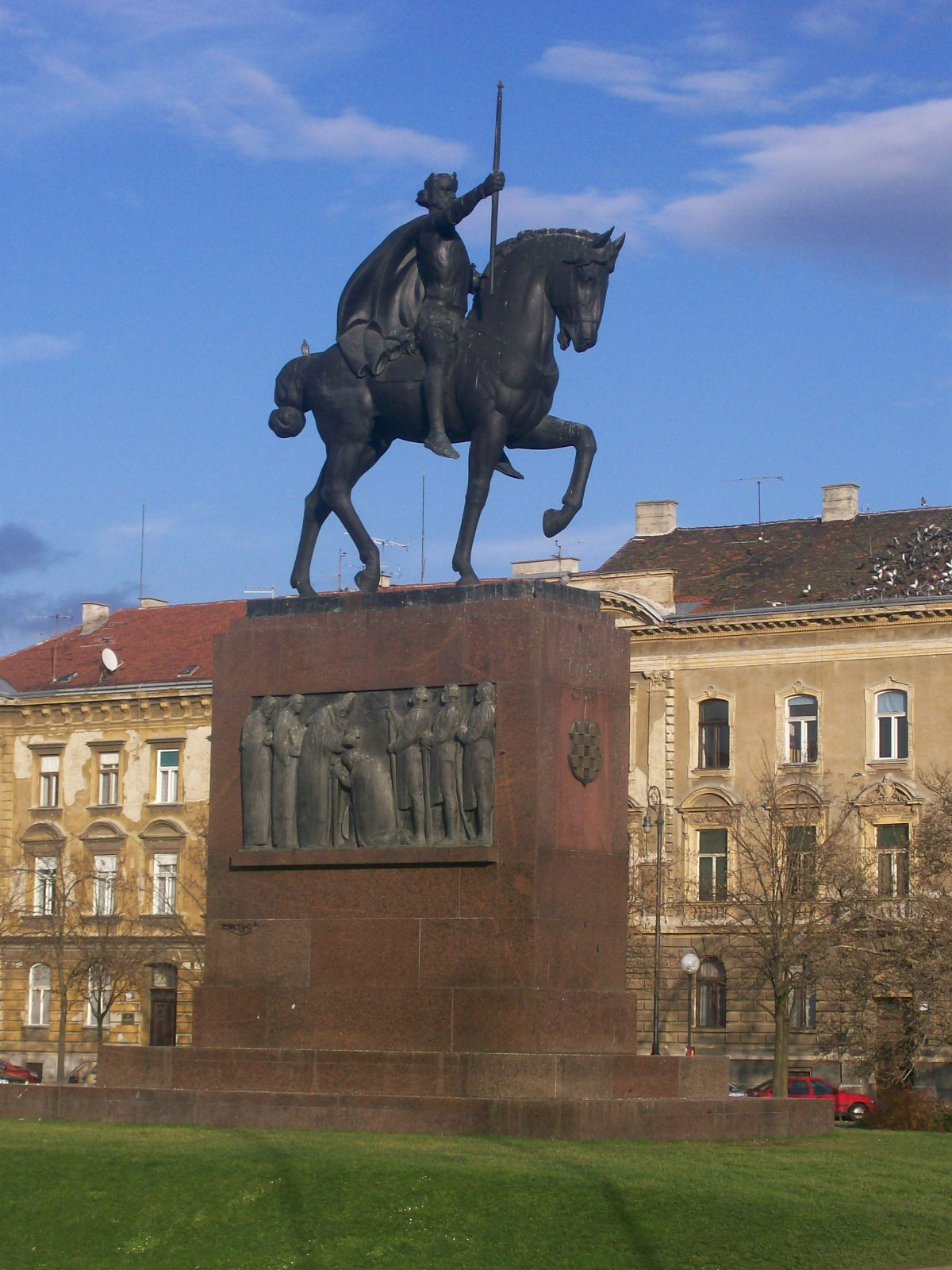
Brill is a co-author of the relief in the base of the statue of King Tomislav in Zagreb.

After the establishment of the Independent State of Croatia, Brill converted to Catholicism. He was arrested by the Ustaše in July 1941, and then quickly released after an intercession from the Gorica utensils factory, where he was employed. In January 1942 he was arrested with his wife and incarcerated in Jasenovac concentration camp where he was forced to feature along with some other Jewish artists including Daniel Ozmo and Daniel Kabiljo in a propaganda film. Brill worked for a while in the camp's ceramics workshop. He died from tuberculosis in January 1943. His wife and her mother perished in Đakovo internment camp.

Brill's works were posthumously featured in group exhibitions in Belgrade (1956–57) and Zagreb (1988, 1996 and 2000), as well as a retrospective exhibition in Zagreb in 2004. Approximately 30 of his gypsum sculptures are kept in the Glyptotheque of the Croatian Academy of Sciences and Arts, and one of his portraits is kept in the Modern Gallery, Zagreb. Some of his glazed ceramic statuettes, made in the Jasenovac concentration camp, are kept in the Jasenovac Memorial Area collection.

== Bibliography ==
- Goldstein, Ivo (2001). Holokaust u Zagrebu. Zagreb: Novi Liber. ISBN 953-6045-19-2.
