= Kabiljo =

Kabiljo is a surname occurring in Southeast Europe. Notable people with the surname include:

- Alfi Kabiljo (1935–2025), Croatian composer and musician
- Daniel Kabiljo (1894–1944), Bosnian Jewish artist
