= Ismet Mujezinović =

- Born: 2 December 1907; Tuzla, Austria-Hungary
- Died: 7 January 1984 (aged 76); Tuzla, SR Bosnia and Herzegovina, SFR Yugoslavia
- Education: Academy of Fine Arts in Zagreb
- Known for: Painting, drawing
- Notable work: Portrait of Roman Petrović; Portrait of Marija; Carrying the Wounded; Crossing the Neretva
- Movement: Poetic realism, intimism, colorism
- Awards: Sixth of April Sarajevo Award (1979)
- Elected: Academy of Sciences and Arts of Bosnia and Herzegovina
- Memorials: Ismet Mujezinović Street (Novi Beograd)

Ismet Mujezinović (2 December 1907 – 7 January 1984) was a Yugoslav and Bosnian painter.

== Life and career ==
Mujezinović was born in Tuzla on 2 December 1907. He graduated from the Academy of Fine Arts in Zagreb, and upon its completion, he stayed in France and attended a course in art history at the Sorbonne University.

He exhibited for the first time in Belgrade in 1930, and he had exhibitions throughout the former Yugoslavia and abroad. On the theme of the National Liberation War (NOB), he created a large number of oil compositions and drawings. Mujezinović's works can be found in art galleries, museums, public buildings of the former Yugoslavia, and in private collections. He was a participant in the National Liberation War from 1941. He left behind drawings, watercolors, prints, and canvases created in the period from 1925 to the end of the eighth decade of the 20th century. He was a member of the Academy of Sciences and Arts of Bosnia and Herzegovina.

From the moment he entered the artistic life until the end of his life, three different eras of recent history shifted, corresponding to three clear periods and opuses of Ismet Mujezinović: the first – lasting from his first solo exhibition in 1926 to 1941, full of changes, maturation, acting in multiple fields, a period of humanistic and ideological commitment, and coloristic bloom that ends in 1941 with the outbreak of World War II; then the war period, which lasted four years. And the third, post-war, a period of cycles, broad social affirmation, a period of fruitful working years.

Often, the first and significant works of Ismet Mujezinović are mentioned as portraits of peasants and old men, painted in pastel, now scattered across private collections, museums, and galleries. In October 1926, he organized his first solo exhibition in Sarajevo. The first significant body of paintings, from a historical-critical perspective, consists of canvases painted in the then-current constructive form, and among these, the best within such an understanding was achieved by Mujezinović in the portraits of the Čaldarović family, painted in 1927 during summer holidays in Bijeljina. The two years of his stay in Paris, from 1931 to 1933, cannot be tracked in the usual way, although Mujezinović was then, as before and after, very productive. He did not paint much. He expanded his interest to other fields, especially literature, theater, and film, and studied art history. Before returning to Sarajevo, where he would settle from 1936, Mujezinović stayed in Zagreb, at the academy in 1933, and in Split in 1935.

During a decade of activity, movement, and searching from Paris, Zagreb, Bijeljina, Split, Gradac, Tuzla, Belgrade to Sarajevo, and his departure to the National Liberation War, Mujezinović created two clear wholes in that period: one consisting of numerous drawings of exceptional quality and relevance, and the other of paintings created out of the need to satisfy patrons, clientele, the environment, and to alleviate his own material needs.

In his pre-war opus, a third line appears in his painting. It was poetic realism, then intimism and colorism that simply dissolved the social and ideological content, leading to pure coloristic painting, not so much by a change of attitude, but through a dualistic process to the replacement of engaged art with the art of color—to "art for art's sake". His first paintings from early 1945, mostly with the theme of refugees, were painted in a fresh green gamut in a neo-romantic spirit reminiscent of his pre-war paintings. At the first exhibitions of the Association of Fine Artists of Bosnia and Herzegovina (ULUBiH), his drawings, studies, and paintings attracted the most attention. Mujezinović was criticized, unlike others, for painting with "strong colors," in vivid coloration. From 1947, he focused on one major theme: "Crossing the Neretva", to which everything else would be subordinated. Finishing the large cycle "Crossing the Neretva" with another equally large painting of the Uprising, Mujezinović also concluded his stay in Sarajevo, which he left in 1953 and moved to Tuzla.

He is one of the founders of the School of Fine Arts in Sarajevo, the Collegium Artisticum group, and the Association of Fine Artists of Bosnia and Herzegovina.

In his honor, a street in Belgrade (Serbia), in the municipality of Novi Beograd, was named Ismet Mujezinović Street.

Mujezinović died in Tuzla on 7 January 1984.

== Works ==
- Žetelice (Reapers)
- Užina na radilištu (Snack at the Worksite)
- Portrait of Marija
- Portrait of Roman Petrović
- Kurir (Courier), pen drawing, ink
- Portrait of Marshal Tito, color linocut
- Prelaz preko Neretve (Crossing the Neretva)
- Proboj (Breakthrough)
- Nošenje ranjenika (Carrying the Wounded)
- Prsa u prsa (Hand-to-Hand), drawing

== Awards ==
- 1979 - Sixth of April Sarajevo Award;

== Literature ==
- Ismet Mujezinović, Serija likovne monografije (Art Monograph Series), Ljubljana 1985.
- Ismet Mujezinović and Meša Selimović, Spomenici, znakovi ljudskog trajanja (Monuments, Signs of Human Endurance), Tuzla 1999.
