= Đoko Mazalić =

Yugoslav and Bosnian painter (1888–1975)

- Self portrait, 1939
- Born: 5 May 1888; Bosanska Kostajnica, Austria-Hungary
- Died: 28 February 1975 (aged 86); Sarajevo, SR Bosnia and Herzegovina, SFR Yugoslavia
- Resting place: Bare Cemetery
- Education: Academy of Fine Arts, Budapest
- Movement: Realism

Đoko Mazalić (5 May 1888 – 28 February 1975) was a Yugoslav and Bosnian painter, considered as one of the pioneers of modern art in Bosnia and Herzegovina.

== Biography ==
Born in Bosanska Kostajnica, Mazalić completed primary school in Prijedor in 1898 and later moved to Sarajevo, where he graduated from the "Velika gimnazija" in 1909. His early talent was nurtured by Ferdinand Velc, a Czech painter teaching at the Sarajevo gymnasium. After visiting museums in Vienna, he exhibited at the 4th Yugoslav Exhibition in Belgrade in 1912.

Mazalić enrolled at the Academy of Fine Arts in Budapest in 1912. His education was interrupted by World War I, during which he served as a lieutenant on the Italian front, where he continued to paint. Following the war, he settled in Sarajevo, where he taught at the male and female gymnasiums. He was a founder of the Gallery of Paintings at the National Museum of Bosnia and Herzegovina in 1930.

During the interwar period, Mazalić participated in the art groups "Četvorica" (1929–1930) and "Krug" (1935–1937). He also authored art criticism, restored artworks, and studied icon technology and historical Bosnian cities. In 1966, he received the July 27th Award for his book Slikarska umjetnost u Bosni i Hercegovini u tursko doba. He also published a lexicon of artists working in Bosnia and Herzegovina in 1967.

== Artistic phases ==
Mazalić's work is divided into four distinct phases:

- First phase (1913–1922): Influenced by academicism and symbolism (e.g., Kopači, 1918; Putanici, 1922).
- Second phase (1925–1930): Marked by magic realism (e.g., Bijeg u Egipat, 1926).
- Third phase (Poetic realism): Focus on color and softened forms.
- Fourth phase (Post-war): Landscapes reminiscent of impressionism, expressionism, and abstraction (e.g., Razgovor s cvijećem, 1965).

== Controversies ==
=== Theft of artworks ===
The painting Magdalena became the subject of a dispute after it appeared on the website of the Institute for the Protection of Cultural Monuments of Novi Sad, Serbia. The rightful owners, Damirka and Enver Mulabdić, sought to reclaim the piece, which is a declared national monument of Bosnia and Herzegovina.

== Selected works ==
- Kopači (Diggers), 1918
- Bijeg u Egipat (Flight into Egypt), 1926
- Herojski kraj (Heroic End), 1927
- Razgovor s cvijećem (Conversation with Flowers), 1965
