= Pero Popović (painter) =

Serbian painter (1881–1941)

- Born: 18 August 1881; Prijedor, Austria-Hungary
- Died: 1 February 1941 (aged 59); Sarajevo, Kingdom of Yugoslavia
- Education: Academy of Fine Arts, Prague
- Patrons: Vlaho Bukovac, František Ženíšek

Pero Popović (Serbian: Перо Поповић, 1881 – 1 February 1941) was a Bosnian Serb painter.

== Biography ==
Pero Popović was born in Prijedor, Bosnia and Herzegovina at the time part of the Austro-Hungarian Empire. After graduating from high school in Sarajevo, he went to Vienna and completed three semesters of philosophy, and then went to the Academy of Fine Arts in Prague and studied painting with Vlaho Bukovac and Czech František Ženíšek.

Popović, with two other student colleagues Todor Švrakić and Branko Radulović, would eventually go on to organize the first exhibition of local painters in Bosnia and Herzegovina in 1907 in Sarajevo and the second one in 1910 in Prijedor. Popović was employed as an art professor at Velika Realka gymnasium in Banja Luka in 1908. Among his students were Milivoj Uzelac and Vilko Gecan. He moved from Banja Luka to Sarajevo in 1930 and remained there for the rest of his life. He painted portraits, landscapes, still lifes, compositions with scenes from everyday life. He also painted icons for an iconostasis for the church in Prijedor and mosaics for the church in Banja Luka.

He transitioned from imitating Bukovac's palette with the pointillist foundations to turning a strong and contrasting coloristic expression, which approached the Seanist poetics and Gauguin. Regarding Popović's paintings, the art historian Vera Jablan writes:

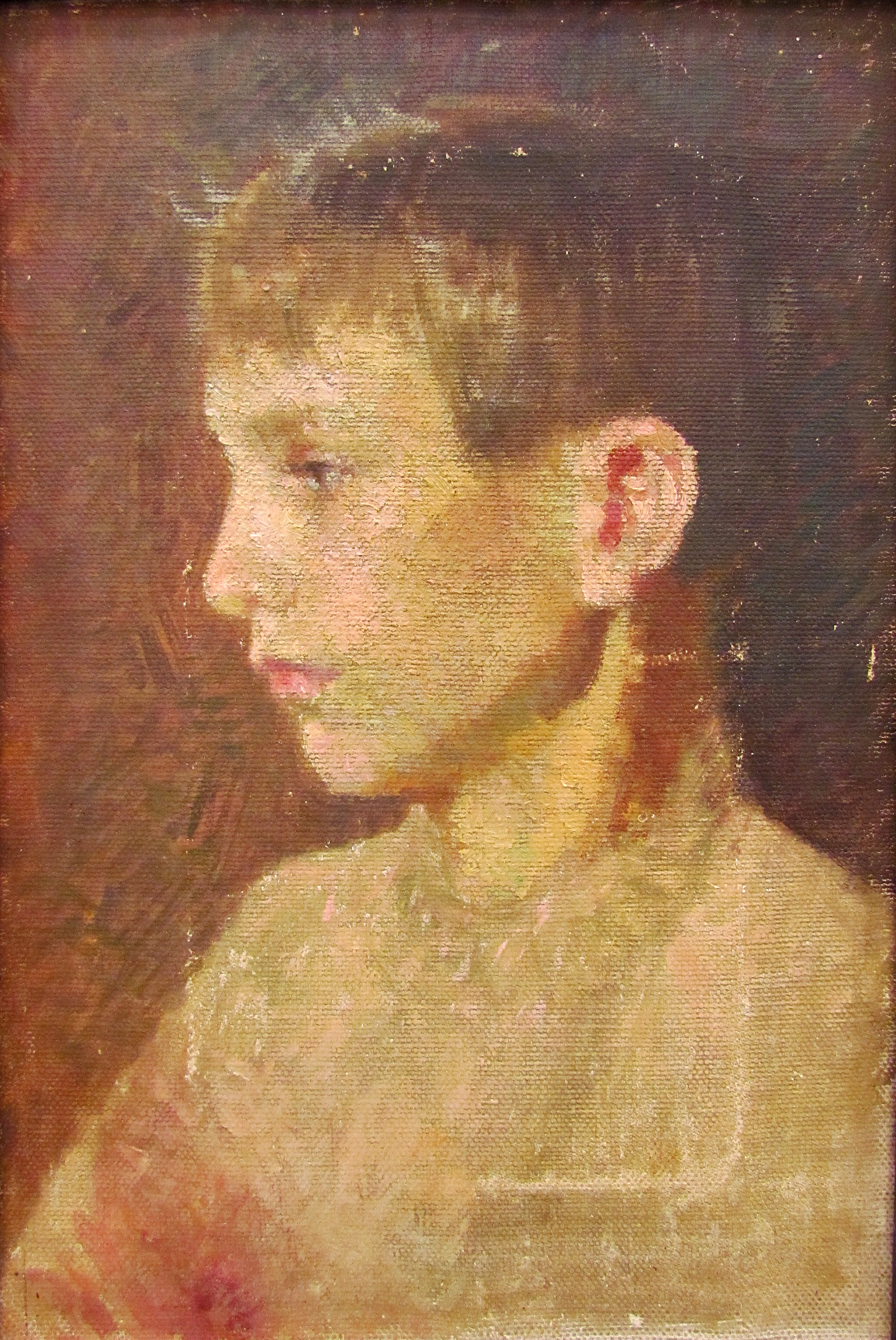
Boy, 1908

"Studies of nudes and portraits, sketches from the streets and unfinished compositions sometimes show how seriously this painter approached the work. How great he had the demands of himself, in front of his artist conscience. independent of the desire and taste of the audience, uninterested in selling his works, he constantly creates."

Popović soon moved away from pointillism, initially with some hesitation, before developing a more independent artistic approach. His works are considered serious studies of colour and tonal relationships. The rich palette of strong tones, bold contrasts in colorand light, expressive drawing, and solid composition characterize his creativity. His style demonstrates a strong sense of overall structure, combined with finely executed detail.

Popović died in Sarajevo.
