= Branko Radulović =

Serbian painter

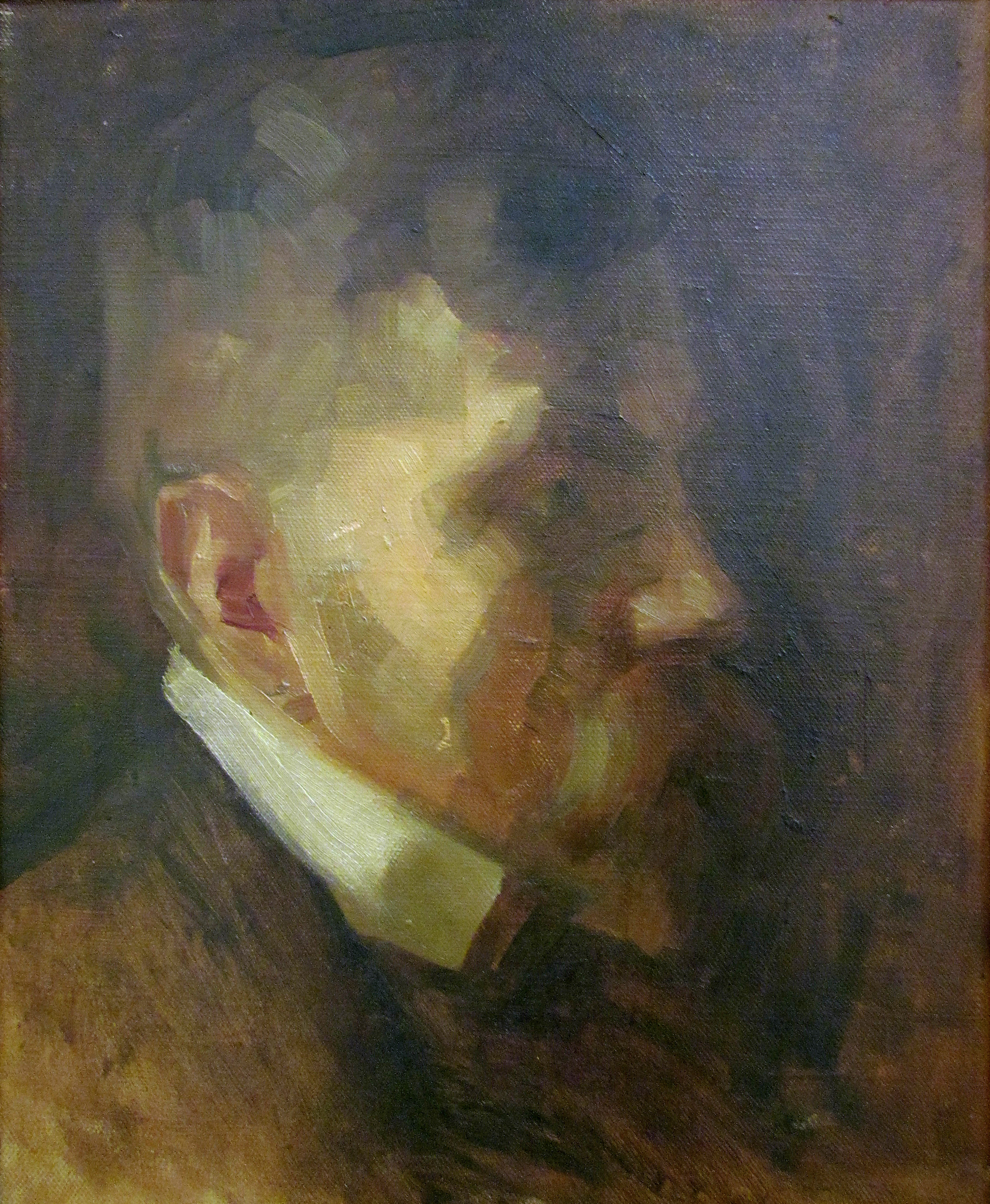
Branko Radulovic, dr Vojislav Kecmanovic, 1909-11

Branko Radulović (1881–1916) was a Serbian painter. He was one of the first group of modern-day academically-trained painters which emerged on the Belgrade art scene in Bosnia and Hercegovina at the turn of the 20th century. Among them were: Branko Radulović, Djordje Mihajlović, Gabriel Jurkić, Todor Švrakić, Petar Tiješić, Karlo Mijić, Djordje Mazalić, Jovan Bijelić, and Roman Petrović.

Among his peers, it is said Branko Radulović showed "exceptional culture and promise" before his life was cut short in the middle of The Great War.

Radulović used a delicate colour palette on small formats, which breathed the first whiff of Impressionist painting into the Bosnian and Herzegovinian history of art. As a painter of romantic nature, he was an active participant in political life and a connoisseur of music. His works helped usher in the beginning of modern art in Bosnia and Herzegovina and in Serbia.

Not much has been written about Radulović due to the fact that his works are scattered and have been poorly researched. He was born on May 26, 1885, in Mostar, where he completed his primary and several years of secondary education which he continued in Belgrade. There he decided to go in for painting and the first step in this regard was made on 9 September in 1903 by entering the Serbian Drawing and Painting School run by Beta Vukanović and Rista Vukanović. Branko immediately accepted the academic painting style of Vukanović and in the same year created “A Portrait of Andja Golubović”, and in the style of Beta Vukanović, he worked on silk small lyrical still lives.

He received a diploma from Vukanović’s school in February 1905 with a recommendation to continue his studies at an academy of fine arts in of the European art capitals. As he was late with enrolment in the Academy of Fine Arts in Prague, Branko attended the private Painting School of Karel Reisner (1868-1913) which claimed to be a sort of preparatory course for admission to the Academy of Fine Arts.

In the autumn of the following year, he was at the Academy, in the class of Vlaho Bukovac, where he met two other artists, Pero Popović and Todor Švrakić, with whom in September 1907 he went on to exhibit in Sarajevo in the first exhibition of local academy-trained artists. Branko Radulović painted in a pointillist style, like that of his professor Bukovac, not only during studies in his class but even in 1907 when he moved in the same academy to the special class of professor František Ženíšek. A painting called “A Girl with a Book” from 1908 testifies about it. Soon, Radulović freed his painting from pointillist “colored” dots and shorter and longer brushstrokes and took en plein air characteristics, as a girl “In a Walk” was painted in 1911. His move to Paris at the beginning of 1912 with the invitation of painter Lazar Drljaca with whom he shared the apartment and studio, marked the most important turning point in his career.

Radulović would have likely further transformed his expression in Paris in accordance with the current European art if he had not gone on to participate in the Balkan Wars and then World War I where he was killed in action in 1916.

== Notable exhibitions ==
- 2017: Branko Radulović, National Gallery of Bosnia and Herzegovina, Sarajevo

== See also ==
- List of painters from Serbia
- Serbian art
