= Obelisk 11 March =

Outdoor sculpture in Berlin

11 March
- This could be a Day of Historical Importance
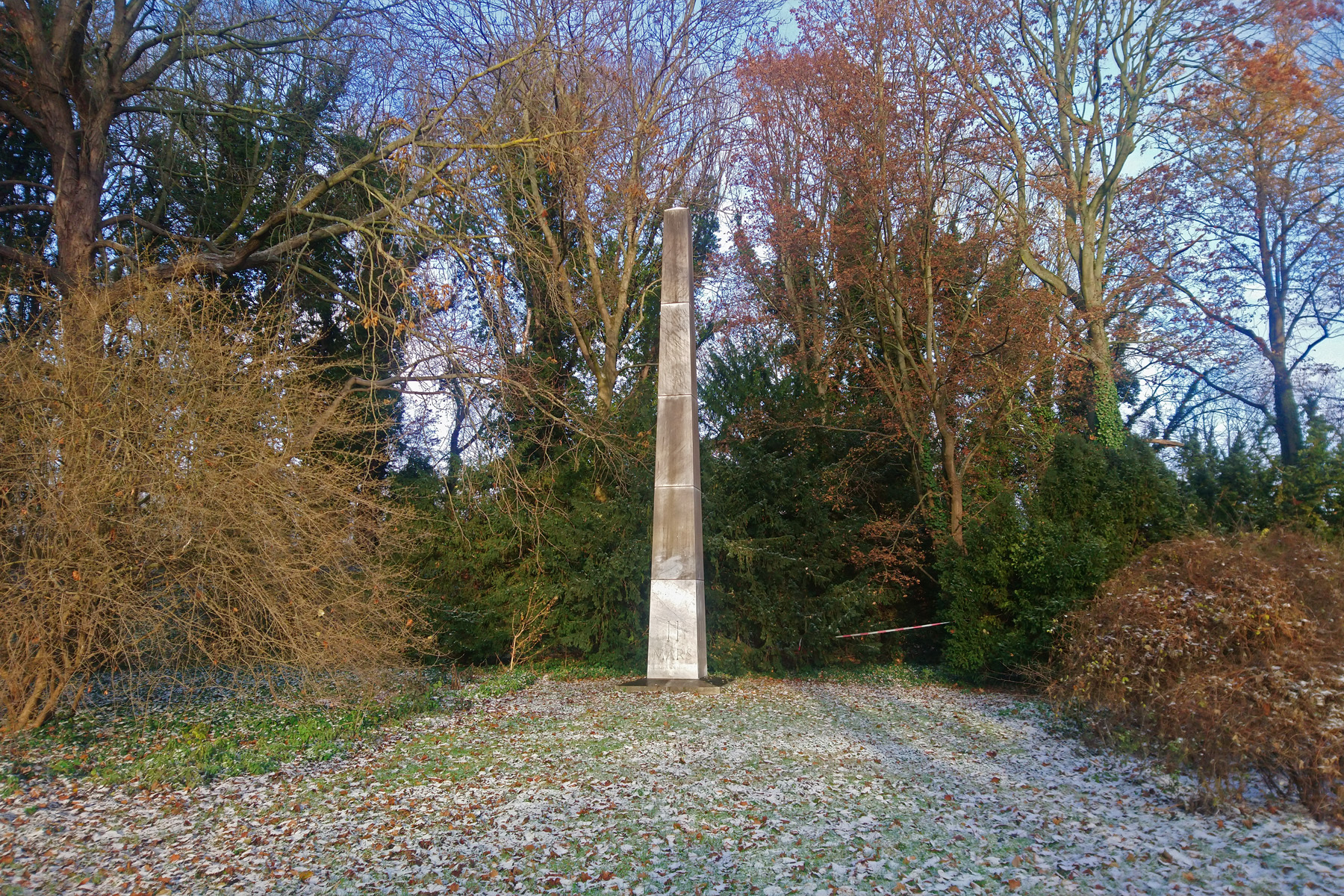
- Artist: Braco Dimitrijević
- Year: 1979
- Medium: White Carrara marble
- Dimensions: 10 m (33 ft)
- Location: Charlottenburg Palace Garden, Berlin, Germany; 52.52872°N 13.29444°E

Obelisk 11 March (full title: 11 March, This could be a Day of Historical Importance) is a 1979 outdoor obelisk memorial by the Yugoslav (now Bosnian) conceptual artist Braco Dimitrijević. It is located in the north-eastern end of the Schloss Charlottenburg park in Berlin, where it can be viewed during daylight hours, year-round. No admission fee required.

The obelisk is a commemoration of an arbitrary date, in fact the result of a chance meeting on a street in West Berlin, 1976. This "obelisk beyond history," as Dimitrijević has labeled it, is an early example of both a large-scale conceptual art work and an anti-monument. The project, initiated by the artist during a residency in Berlin in 1976, was completed in 1979 with the financial assistance of the Senate of Berlin, the Berlin Lottery Foundation, DAAD and the former Verwaltung der Staatlichen Schlösser und Gärten in West Berlin.

== The Casual Passer-by ==
Dimitrijević gained an international reputation in the seventies with his "Casual Passer-by" series of works, in which anonymous people were given the attention usually reserved for dignitaries, often in the form of large photo portraits displayed on cultural institutions and other prominent facades in cities like Paris, London, Venice and Zagreb. The artist also mimicked other ways of glorifying important persons, such as putting up busts and memorial plaques. This strategy of involving pure chance and fellow citizens has over the years given the artist the means to critically challenge aspects of Western memory culture, its underlying power structures, as well as "anonymity imposed by historical processes" and "the vagaries of chance, the whims of history, and the fickleness of celebrity."

I initiated this discourse at the beginning of my work in 1969 with the statement: "There are no mistakes in history, the whole of history is a mistake." This marked a revolt against history which I have always considered as being a false science and which I would call the only impressionistic science.

— Braco Dimitrijević

== 11 March ==
The eponymous date of the work was decided on by a casual passer-by, Peter Malwitz, who Dimitrijević encountered by chance on the street in Berlin. Malwitz's motivation for selecting 11 March was that it was his birthday.

11 March is the 70th day of the year (71st in leap years) in the Gregorian calendar. Compared to generally well-known dates of the calendar – for example 1 January, 8 March, 1 May, 11 September, or 25 December – 11 March is altogether more neutral and anonymous. The article March 11 has a list of events and observances taking place on this date. However, all of the events listed are equally unimportant to the work.

The obelisk's four sides have the inscription 11 March – This Could be a Day of Historical Importance done in four languages: French, English, German and Bosnian.

== Gallery ==
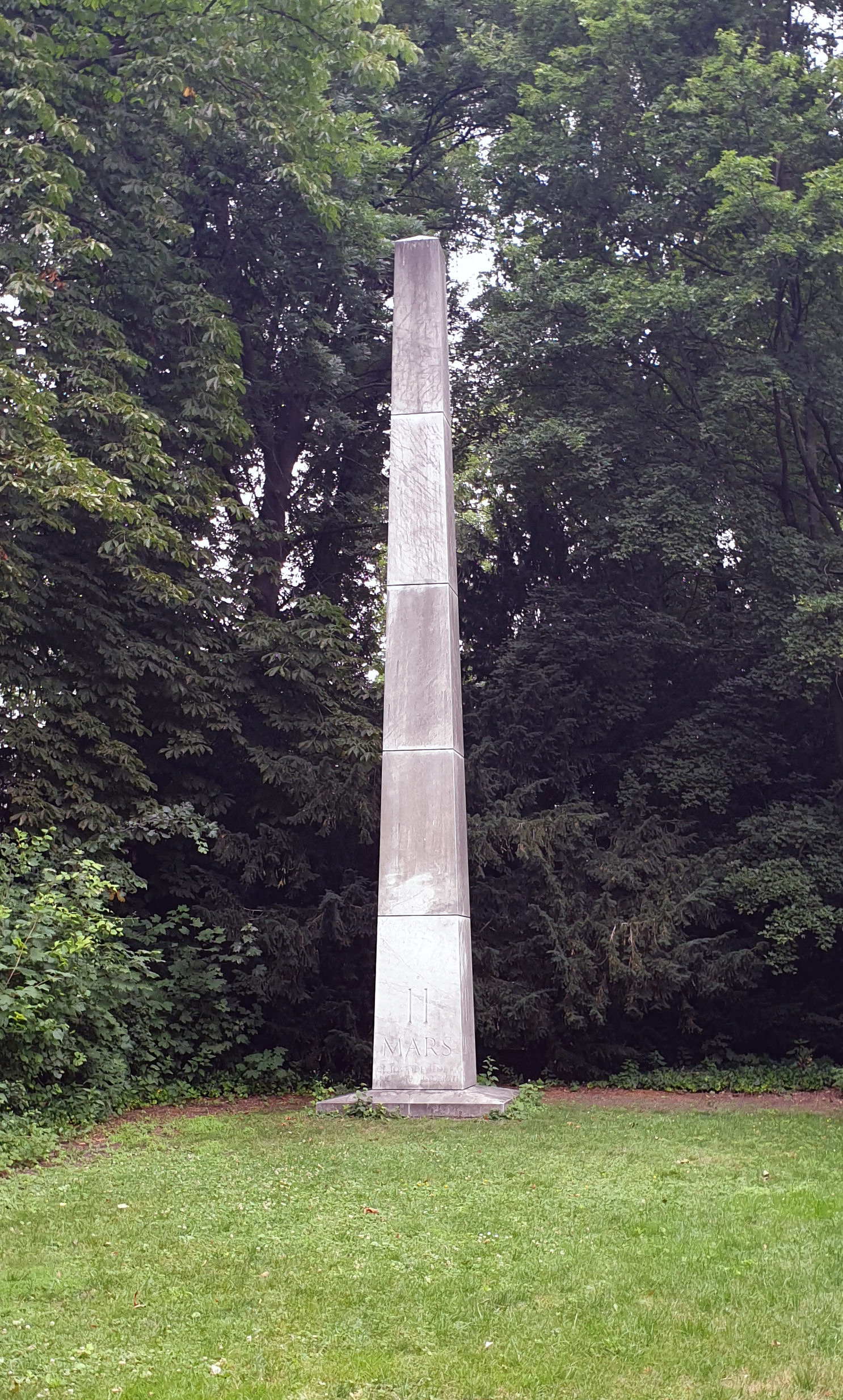

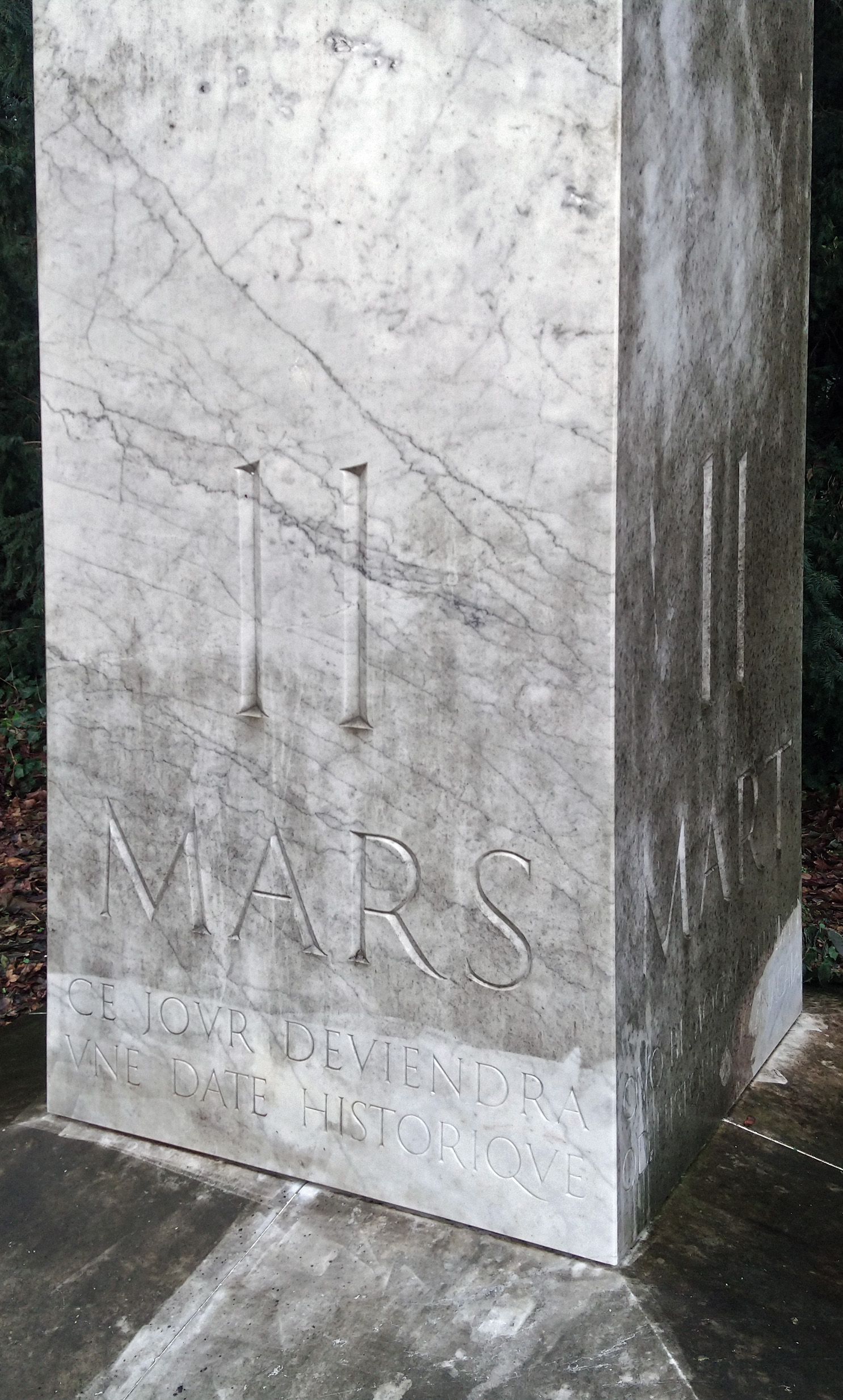

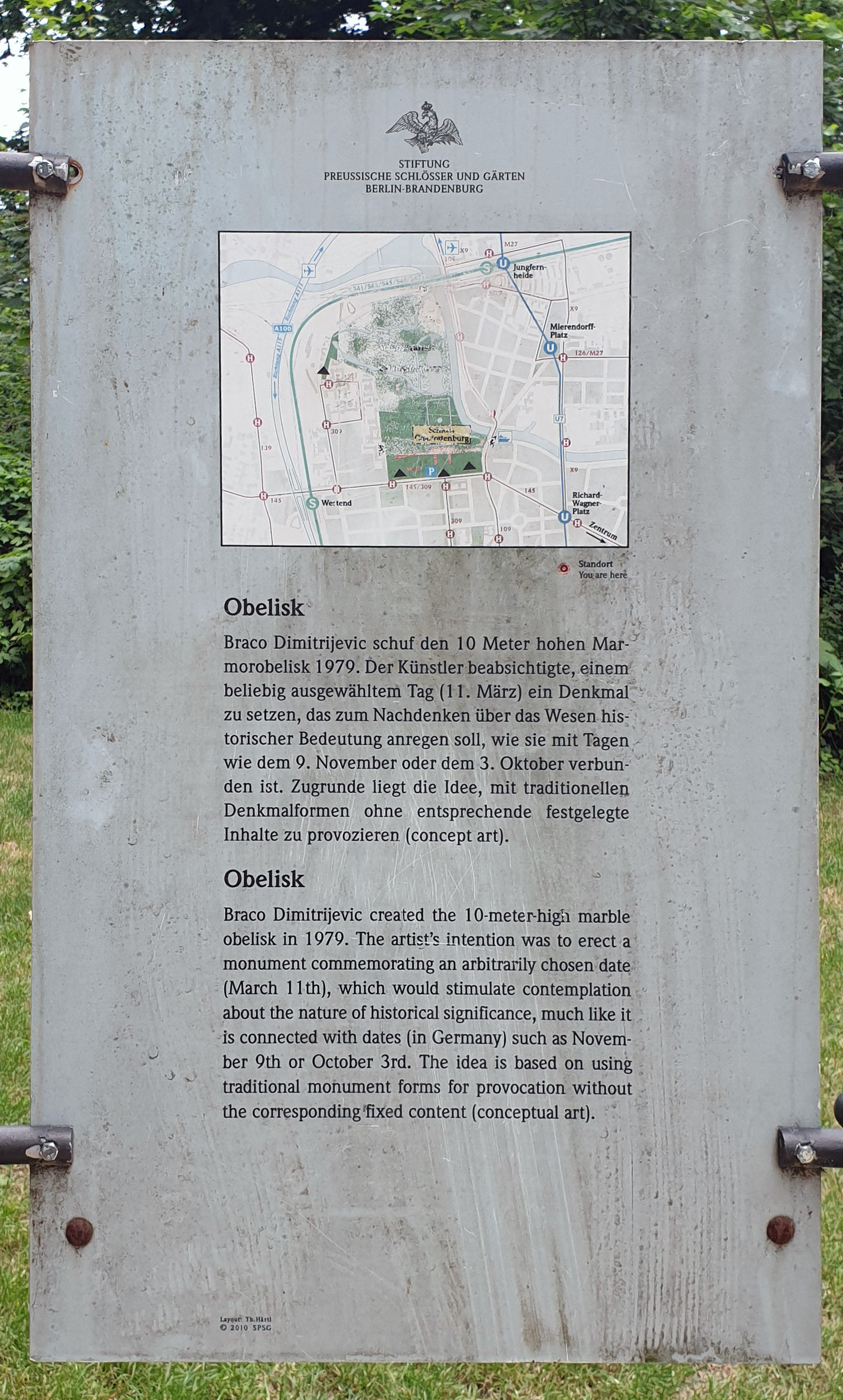

== Misinterpretations ==
After decades of patination, and also owing largely to its location among several 18th-century sculptures and memorials, the work is sometimes mistaken for an original 18th-century artefact, possibly "one brought from some expedition to decorate Friedrich III’s summer palace".

By using an arbitrarily chosen date, the work is meant to stimulate contemplation about the essence of historical significance rather than casually being attached to specific events. Nevertheless, it has on a few occasions been appropriated by communities for private anniversaries. One example is how Lithuanian expats and officials in Berlin use the obelisk in various ways to mark 11 March 1990, the day when Lithuania declared its independence from the Soviet Union and thus, as they see it, fulfilled "the prophecy of the monument". This lack of understanding was shown publicly also by the Lithuanian Minister of Foreign Affairs in a 2021 tweet – a quite paradoxical outcome when seen in the context of the artist's intention to both deconstruct state propaganda and provide an alternative to a place typically reserved for the political elite.

On the other hand, when it comes to history in general, the artist has expressed a hope for a multitude of interpretations rather than official mono-visions and typical Eurocentric perspectives:

As I see it, history should be composed of an infinite number of interpretations of events, so that the difference between legend and history would disappear.

— Braco Dimitrijević
