= Collegium Artisticum =

- Established: 6 April 1975
- Location: Sarajevo, Bosnia and Herzegovina
- Coordinates: 43°52′N 18°25′E
- Type: Art Museum
- Collection size: 16,000
- Website: www.collegium.ba

Collegium Artisticum is a contemporary art gallery in Sarajevo, Bosnia and Herzegovina. It was established on 6 April 1975 and was named after the short lived artistic movement of the same name which existed in Sarajevo from 1939 to the start of the Second World War. It was founded as the gallery of Bosnia and Herzegovina’s three major Art Associations – Association of Artists (ULUBIH), Association of Applied Arts and Design (ULUPUBIH) and Association of Architects (AABIH). Today it functions as a Public Institution City Gallery Collegium Artisticum and hosts the annual Collegium Artisticum exhibition.

== History ==
=== Art movement ===
Jugoslovenski list newspaper clipping on the movement, 1939.

The Kingdom of Yugoslavia was, from its inception, closely tied to the Allies of World War I and especially to France. By the mid-1930s, France, internally divided, was increasingly unable to play an important role in Eastern Europe and to politically support Yugoslavia, which had suffered badly from the economic crisis of that period. By contrast, Nazi Germany was increasingly willing to get into barter agreements with the countries of southeastern Europe. In the process those countries felt it was against their interests to closely follow France.

An additional motive to improve relations with Italy and Germany was that Italy supported the Croatian fascist-separatist Ustashe movement. As head of the Croatian Peasant Party (HSS), Vlatko Maček, openly courted fascist Italy in the hope of receiving Italian support for Croatian secession from Yugoslavia. First Regent Prince Paul of Yugoslavia judged closer relations with Italy were inevitable. In an effort to rob the HSS of potential Italian support, a treaty of friendship was signed between the two countries in 1937. This in fact diminished the Ustashe threat somewhat since Mussolini jailed some of their leaders and temporarily withdrew financial support.

In 1938, Germany, annexing Austria, became a neighbour of Yugoslavia. The feeble reaction of France and Britain, later that year, during the Sudeten Crisis convinced Belgrade that a European war was inevitable and that it would be unwise to support France and Britain. Instead, Yugoslavia officially tried to stay aloof but unofficially instigated a pro-fascist domestic policy spearheaded by the Milan Stojadinović-led government and populist political organizations such as the Yugoslav National Movement headed by Dimitrije Ljotić, this in spite of Paul's personal sympathies for Britain and Serbia's establishment's predilections for France. In the meantime, Germany and Italy tried to exploit Yugoslavia's domestic problems, and so did Maček. In the end, the regency agreed to the formation of Banovina Hrvatska in August 1939 which abolished Bosnia and Herzegovina's territorial integrity and historical borders. Numerous antisemitic measures enacted by Yugoslav minister of the interior, Anton Korošec, quickly followed.

The Collegium Artisticum movement was established the same year as a reaction to the Kingdom's political climate. It was founded as part of the Sarajevo Philharmonic Orchestra and was headed by a group of leftist public intellectuals and artists that included painter Vojo Dimitrijević, composer Oskar Danon and architect Jahiel Finci. The movement openly professed anti-fascism while boycotting state-sponsored art projects and programmes. Furthermore, it organized clandestine exhibitions and leftist conferences in Sarajevo, aligning itself with the illegal Communist Party of Yugoslavia. The movement was banned by the government in 1940, with some of its members being jailed.

=== Art museum ===
With the end of the Second World War a number of Bosnian artists established the annual Collegium Artisticum exhibition in 1947. The initial founders were all former members of the Collegium Artisticum movement and included Ismet Mujezinović, Vojo Dimitrijević, Mica Todorović, Vojislav Hadžidamjanović, Roman Petrović, Behaudin Selmanović, Sigo Summerecker, Petar Šain and Hakija Kulenović. On the 30th anniversary of the Liberation of Sarajevo in 1975 the City Assembly in cooperation with the Association of Artists (ULUBIH), Association of Applied Arts and Design (ULUPUBIH) and the Association of Architects (AABIH) founded the Collegium Artisticum contemporary art museum.

Over its more than four decades of existence, Collegium Artisticum has hosted over a thousand exhibitions. The gallery has featured works from all prominent artists from Bosnia and Herzegovina, as well as notable figures from the former Yugoslavia. The Grand Prix awarded by Collegium Artisticum at its annual April 6th Exhibition is regarded as one of the most prestigious art awards in the region.

Three artistic associations operate within Collegium Artisticum’s space: ULUBiH (Association of Fine Artists), ULUPUBiH (Association of Applied Artists), and AABiH (Association of Architects of Bosnia and Herzegovina). These associations contribute to the gallery’s vibrant role in supporting and showcasing artistic expression in Bosnia and Herzegovina.

== Gallery ==
East wing

exhibits

exhibits
