= Daniel Kabiljo =

Daniel Kabiljo (6 March 1894, Sarajevo, Condominium of Bosnia and Herzegovina, Austro-Hungarian Empire – 1944, Jasenovac concentration camp) was a Bosnian artist. His lithographs of Sephardi life were published in 1924 but the originals are lost.

His art was featured in a propaganda film made by the Ustashe which also featured sculptor Slavko Brill. The group of artists also included Daniel Ozmo one of the younger generation of Sarajevo’s Sephardic artists.

He, along with other Sarajevo Jews, was captured and imprisoned by the Ustashe in 1941. He was transferred first to Stara Gradiška and then to Jasenovac, where he died in 1944.

== Surviving paintings ==
Some of Kabiljo's surviving works are on public display:

- An Old House, oil painting, 1930s. National Gallery of Bosnia and Herzegovina, Sarajevo
- Jewish Women in Sarajevo, Jewish Historical Museum, Belgrade
- The Old Sephardic Woman on The Market, oil, 1935, City Museum of Sarajevo
- The Conversation, oil, 1930s, City Museum of Sarajevo
- From the Outskirts of Sarajevo, oil on canvas, 1920s-1930s, National Gallery of Bosnia and Herzegovina
- A Street in Sarajevo, colored linocut, 1920s-1930s, National Gallery of Bosnia and Herzegovina
- A Street in Sarajevo, India ink on paper, 1920s-1930s, National Gallery of Bosnia and Herzegovina, Sarajevo

Others are held in private collections:

- A Street in Sarajevo, colored linocut, 1937
- Motifs from Sarajevo's Old Turkish Market, the Baščaršija, 1930s

== See also ==
- Bosnia and Herzegovina art#Art in the Austro-Hungarian period
