= Daniel Ozmo =

Painter (1912–1942)

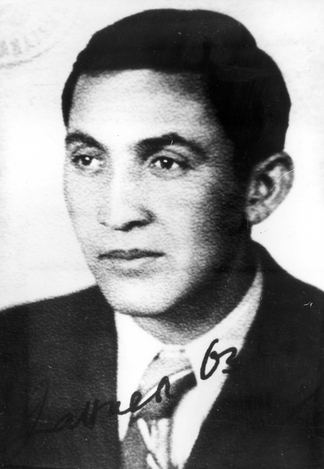
- Born: Daniel Ozmo; 14 March 1912; Olovo, Condominium of Bosnia and Herzegovina, Austria-Hungary
- Died: 5 September 1942 (aged 30); Jasenovac concentration camp
- Occupations: Painter; printmaker

Daniel Ozmo (14 March 1912 – 5 September 1942) was a Bosnian painter and printmaker. He studied in Belgrade, where he became a member of the communist progressive youth movement.

His paintings, other than of Sephardi Jewish life, portrayed social relations in rural and working class Bosnia. His works were exhibited from 1932 to 1940 in Sarajevo, where he was one of the founding group of young painters, and in Belgrade in 1937.

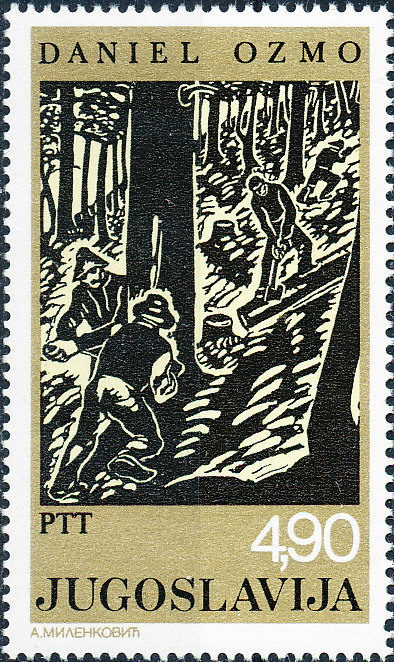
Woordcutters by Ozmo on a 1978 Yugoslav stamp

Ozmo was captured along with Daniel Kabiljo in Sarajevo by the Nazis after the Invasion of Yugoslavia. Due to his involvement with the Collegium Artisticum movement in the 1930s, he was known as a leftist. Ozmo hid with his sister's family to avoid arrest, but was ambushed by the police while attempting to flee the city. He was deported to the Jasenovac concentration camp on 16 November 1941. At the camp, he was forced to perform heavy labor such as; building the camp barracks, a wire fence and a dam. Ozmo was also the kapo of an artists' workshop known as the "ceramic group" which produced "official" propaganda art for the camp. Some of these works are kept in the Historical Museum of Bosnia and Herzegovina. He was executed in the camp in 1942, either on 1 August or 5 September, by shooting.
