= Sasha Toperich =

American scholar (born 1972)

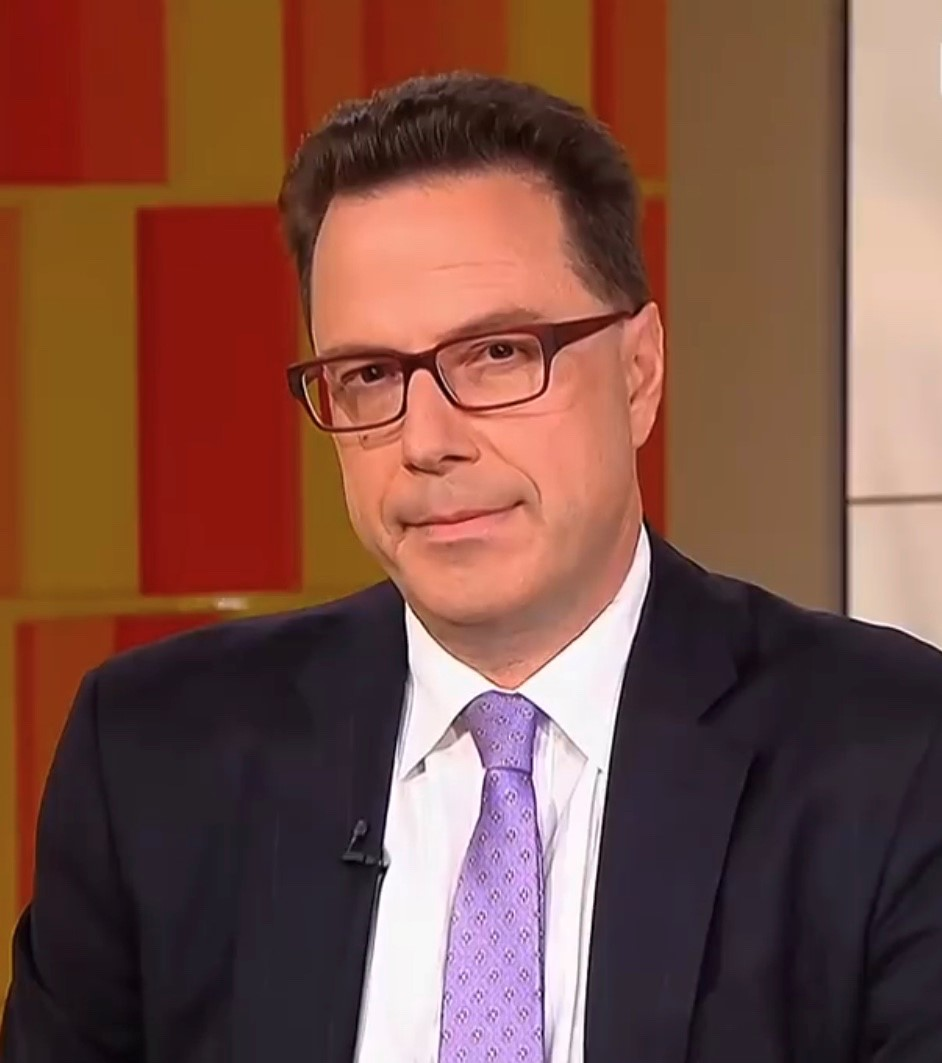

Senior Executive Vice President Transatlantic Leadership Network Washington D.C.
- In office 2019–present

Director, Mediterranean Basin, Middle East, and Gulf Initiative Center for Transatlantic Relations SAIS at Johns Hopkins University Washington, D.C.
- In office 2013–2019

Advisor to the Presidency of Bosnia and Herzegovina
- In office 2011–2013

Presidential Envoy of Bosnia and Herzegovina to the United States
- In office 2003–2008

Personal details
- Born: Saša Toperić; 1972 (age 53–54) Sarajevo, Yugoslavia
- Education: Rubin Academy of Music and Dance, Lovran Academy of Music
- Website: www.sashatoperich.com

Sasha Toperich, also written as Saša Toperić (born 1972), is a naturalized American scholar and politician, also an Israeli citizen and Sarajevo born author, academic, diplomat, and strategist. In his youth, Toperich was known as a skilled concert pianist. He is currently the Senior Executive Vice President of the Transatlantic Leadership Network, a Washington, D.C. think tank.

== Early life ==
Toperich was born in Sarajevo, then part of Yugoslavia but now in Bosnia and Herzegovina. He began playing piano at the age of four. During his years of study, he won first prize at the piano students competition in Dubrovnik.

In the early 1990s, Toperich moved to Jerusalem, where he completed formal training at the Rubin Academy of Music and Dance, studying under Irina Berkovich. Later on, Toperich earned his doctoral degree at the Music Academy in Lovran, Croatia, where he studied with Marina Ambokadze.

== US career ==
During his tenure at the CTR Johns Hopkins University SAIS, Toperich chaired various projects and initiatives. He supported Iraqi Kurdistan and Peshmerga's fight against the ISIS, visiting the war frontlines many times, accompanied by Sirwan Barzani, Peshmerga General. Toperich witnessed the battle of Bashiqa, a city at the doorsteps of Mosul that was liberated soon after. For raising awareness of Peshmerga worldwide, Toperich was awarded military plaque of appreciation. Toperich established a close relationship with KDP and Masrour Barzani and was supportive of Kurdistan Region's referendum on independence.

Toperich chaired the annual Southeast Europe Transatlantic Economic Forum held at the Johns Hopkins Kenney Auditorium that brought together political and business leaders from the SEE region. Each year, the initiative awarded individuals with the “Mediterranean Basin Leadership Award” including US Rep. Robert Aderholt (R-AL), US Senator Jim Inhofe (R-OH), US Senator Jeanne Shaheen (D-NH) and US Senator Roger Wicker (R-MI).

Toperich hosted Mustapha Ben Jafar, a Speaker of the Constituent Assembly of Tunisia soon after the country passed most progressive constitution in the Arab world. He is the board member of the Mediterranean Development Initiative (MDI) in Tunisia.

Toperich visited Tripoli (Libya) after receiving an invitation by Mohammad Yusuf al Magariaf, the first president of the General National Congress of Libya, following the fall of Muamar Gaddafi. Toperich published numerous articles on Libya and is frequently guest on various TV stations in the Middle East. He visited Tripoli again in 2019 during the LNA military campaign Operation Flood of Dignity, intended to capture western region of Libya, including capital Tripoli, by force. His visit to the frontlines, on the outskirts of Tripoli, was broadcast on Libyan TV.

Toperich's article published by the Newsweek in support of Texas Supreme Court Ruling allowing Texas to enforce state deportation law was featured in Newsweek's “The Daily Debate” against liberal Raul Reyes, a member of the USA Today board of contributors and CNN opinion writer. Toperich supports securing of the US southern border and deportation of illegals from the US.

Although a Republican, Toperich's political mentor was Richard C. Holbrooke, who was also an honorary chair of the America-Bosnia Foundation. Holbrooke was the architect of the Dayton Peace Accords that brought peace to Bosnia and Herzegovina, a probable reason for deep connection between the two.

In 2024, Toperich was recognized by Marquis Who's Who for Expertise in Nonprofit Organizing.

He testified before the US Congress.

== Piano career ==
His performances have been broadcast on radio and television programs in France, Austria, Israel, Brazil, the United States, Japan, China, South Korea, Belgium, The Netherlands and the countries of former Yugoslavia. Toperich has performed with conductors such as Zubin Mehta and Kuzushi Ono. In 1997, he earned a nomination as Best Debut Artist after a nationwide broadcast of a concert in Washington, D.C. Known for a combination of sensitivity and technical skill, Toperich was known as one of the world's premier up-and-coming pianists. He also performed in most prestigious concert halls - Carnegie Hall (New York) and Concertgebouw (Amsterdam).

In 2004, he became the first concert pianist to perform in Monrovia (Liberia) at a concert organized by Jacques P. Klein, then the United Nations Special Representative in Liberia. The concert was broadcast live throughout the African continent.

Toperich visited Fukushima following the nuclear accident and tsunami in 2011 where he met with the Fukushima prefecture leadership. Soon after, together with his friend Japanese famous violin virtuoso Eijin Nimura (also UNESCO Artist for Peace) he performed a humanitarian concert for orphans in Fukushima at the KIOI hall in Tokyo, a concert that was organized by the Embassy of Israel in Tokyo and under the auspices of Fukushima prefecture.

== Philanthropy ==
In 1997, he became President of the Children Foundation of UNESCO. He was awarded the honorary title of UNESCO Artist for Peace the following year. However, in 2001, he resigned his honorary title, in protest of UNESCO's decision not to display the work of Tibetan artists on United Nations premises.

Toperich met with His Holiness the Dalai Lama on several occasions and has hosted a closed conference on multi-ethic co-existence with Chinese and Tibetan scholars held in Bangkok, (Thailand) in 2006.

In the early 2000s, Toperich's career shifted from concert piano to philanthropy. Toperich founded the America-Bosnia Foundation in 2002, which was established to foster stronger political, cultural and educational ties between the American and Bosnian people. The foundation organizes concerts, exhibitions, lectures, panels, and educational seminars in both Bosnia and Herzegovina and in the United States. ABF's mission is also to strengthen democratic values in Bosnia and preserve its multi-ethnic and multicultural character.

In 2004, in association with Laughing Buddha Music Inc., Toperich launched the “Visas for Life” project, an educational/historic/diplomatic story of Japanese diplomat Chiune Sugihara, who saved around 6000 Jews during World War II by issuing transit visas through Japan, when he served as a Japanese Consul in Kaunas, Lithuania.

With Shinichiro Okuyama (Japan), Toperich co-founded the World Youth Leadership Network in 2004, a not-for-profit organisation that aims to unite the international youth community through good works and cultural exchange, launching it at the UN Headquarters in New York City. WYLN has contributed and donated computers to schools and universities in Liberia, organized a fundraising concert in Monrovia for the Louis Arther Grimes School of Law, and set up an IT centre in Benin in collaboration with the Benin Education Fund and the World Bank to allow students to learn and gain new skills.

Also in 2004, Toperich served as a project manager for the European Youth Peace Summit held in Sarajevo, bringing together around 500 youth leaders from various countries in Europe, as part of the global youth summits organized under the UN “Decade of Culture of Peace” umbrella. Budimir Lončar, former Foreign Minister of Yugoslavia under Marshal Tito, and later, top advisor to Stjepan Mesic, President of Croatia, was Senior Advisor to the Summit appointed by Rabbi Arthur Schneier, a member of the High-Level Group and Ambassador of the UN Alliance of Civilizations.

== Diplomacy ==
Toperich then transitioned to diplomacy. The President of Bosnia and Herzegovina appointed Toperich as Presidential Envoy of Bosnia and Herzegovina to the United States in 2003, holding a rank equivalent to Ambassador. In 2006, he became the first high-ranking diplomat from Bosnia and Herzegovina to officially visit Baghdad after fall of Saddam Hussein where he met with the Iraqi president Jalal Talabani. From 2009 -2010, Toperich served as a Counsellor at the Permanent Mission of Bosnia and Herzegovina to the United Nations, with mandate over the country's successful bid to join the United Nations Security Council as a non-permanent member for a two-year term.
