= Braco Dimitrijević =

Bosnian conceptual artist

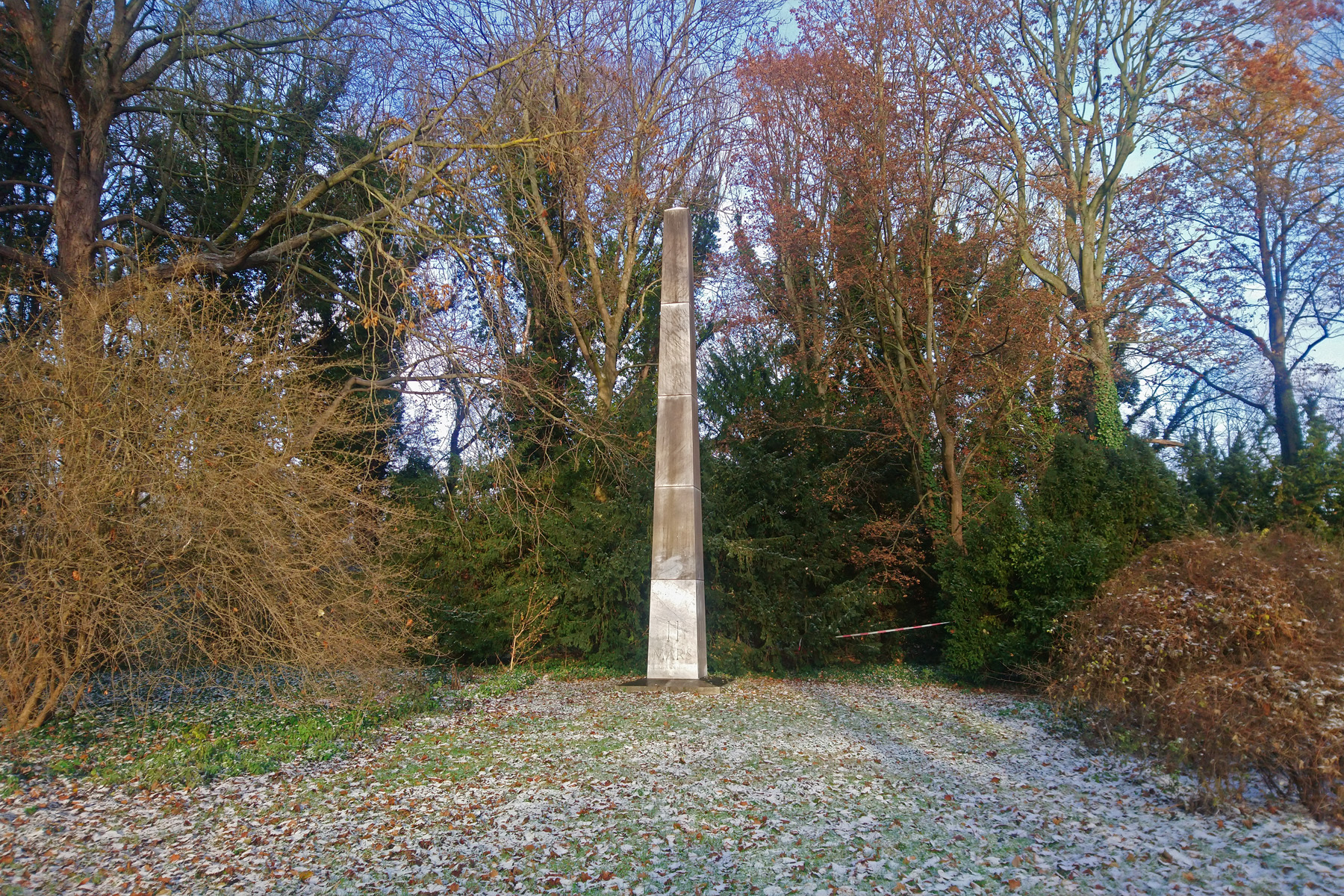
- Born: Slobodan Dimitrijević; 18 June 1948; Sarajevo, PR Bosnia and Herzegovina, FPR Yugoslavia
- Education: Academy of Fine Arts, Zagreb; Saint Martin's School of Art, London
- Notable work: Obelisk 11 March; Casual Passers-by
- Movement: Conceptual Art
- Website: www.bracodimitrijevic.com

Slobodan "Braco" Dimitrijević (born 18 June 1948) is a former Yugoslav and French conceptual artist. His works deal mainly with history and the individual's place in it. He lives and works in Paris, France since 1980s.

He has exhibited internationally since the 1970s, including at the Tate Gallery in 1985. He has participated in documenta (1972, 1977 and 1992) and the Venice Biennale (1976, 1982, 1990, 1993 and 2009). His works are held in the collection of the Tate Gallery, MoMA Museum of Modern Art New York, and that of the Centre Pompidou, among others.

== Early life and work ==
Braco Dimitrijević was born on 18 June 1948 in Sarajevo, Bosnia and Herzegovina, FPR Yugoslavia. His father was the painter Vojo Dimitrijević, one of the most famous modern artists in Yugoslavia. He was named Slobodan after his father's friend who saved his life, a war hero Slobodan Princip. He started painting at the age of 5 and was featured in a TV show entitled Filmske Novosti (Film News) in 1957. His first conceptual work dates back to 1963.

He went on to study at Academy of Fine Arts in Zagreb, from which he graduated in 1971. He then studied at Saint Martin's School of Art in London from 1971 to 1973.

In 1976, he wrote Tractatus Post Historicus, which formed the theoretical basis of his early work.

== Casual Passers-by ==
In the 1970s, Dimitrijevic gained attention when he began his Casual Passer-by series. The work features very big close-up photographic portraits of everyday people that were hung on buildings and billboard in different cities in Europe and America. He then went on to produce memorial plaques in honour of other people that he met. About the one he made for the Lucio Amelio's "Terrae Motus" collection he said: "I Stopped the first man i saw in the street, explained to him what my work was and then asked him to be the model for the foto".

== Animals ==
His work from the 1980s which joined animals and works of art would go on to become an exhibition in 1998 at the Paris Zoo that was visited by over a million people.

== New work ==
His Triptychos Post Historicus installations feature paintings by old or modern masters in conjunction with everyday objects and fruits/vegetables. More than 500 of these installations exist. Controversy arose when a man who visited the exhibition at the Tate realized that the paintings in question were not copies but the originals and reported this to The Times who then wrote about it.

== Autobiography ==
In 2023, he released his autobiography: "Louvre is my atelier, the street is my museum" published by "Fraktura" Zagreb.

== See also ==
- List of painters from Bosnia and Herzegovina
