= Vojo Dimitrijević =

- Born: May 20, 1910; Sarajevo, Bosnia and Herzegovina
- Died: August 12, 1980 (aged 70); Sarajevo, Bosnia and Herzegovina
- Education: State Art School in Belgrade
- Known for: Painting
- Children: Braco Dimitrijević
- Awards: Sixth of April Award of Sarajevo

Vojo Dimitrijević (May 20, 1910 – August 12, 1980) was a prominent Bosnian-Herzegovinian painter of the 20th century and a pioneer of modern art in Bosnia and Herzegovina. He graduated from the State Art School in Belgrade in 1936, after which he visited the studio of André Lhote in Paris.

== Artistic Work ==
His artistic oeuvre developed in a range from socially engaged painting, through geometric abstraction, to conceptual painting practices akin to analytical and process painting. Due to his distinctive, stylistically non-homogeneous oeuvre, early abandonment of ideological motifs, and adherence to avant-garde trends, Dimitrijević was often the subject of numerous debates within the art profession and politics.

In 1939, along with Oskar Danon, Ana Rajs, and Jahiel Finci, Dimitrijević was one of the founders of the alternative group Collegium Artisticum. The significance of this group is highlighted in the specific socio-political context of the Kingdom of Yugoslavia on the eve of World War II, when the autonomy of Bosnia and Herzegovina was undermined by the nationalist policies of Zagreb and Belgrade, specifically the Cvetković–Maček Agreement.

He participated in the founding of the Association of Fine Artists of Bosnia and Herzegovina (ULUBIH) and the School of Applied Arts in Sarajevo, where he worked as a director and professor. He was a member of the Academy of Sciences and Arts of Bosnia and Herzegovina.

In 2010, a major retrospective exhibition was held at the Art Gallery of Bosnia and Herzegovina in Sarajevo to mark the artist's centennial. Discussing the artistic creation of Vojo Dimitrijević, curator Ivana Udovičić stated:

His first painting is dated to 1930, marking the social period, the art of engagement. Then follows the part not represented in this exhibition - a part of the graphic oeuvre that he dealt with immediately before and after the Second World War. These paintings will be exhibited at the Historical Museum of BiH in seven days. After the Second World War, the themes and preoccupations in the work of Vojo Dimitrijević were mainly portraits, landscapes, then again reminiscences of the war and the National Liberation War, of which he was an active member from the very beginning. In the last decade of his work, he turned to complete abstraction using non-painting materials such as nylon, wire, newspapers.

— Ivana Udovičić

== Works ==
- Kraj peći (By the Stove), oil on canvas, 1930.
- Španija (Spain), oil on canvas.
- Portrait of the painter Ismet Mujezinović, oil on canvas, 1939.
- Ulica pod snijegom (Street under Snow), oil on canvas, 1951.
- Život u kući radnika (Life in a Worker's House), linocut.
- Fašizam caruje (Fascism Reigns).
- Bolničarka Rava previja ranjenika (Nurse Rava Bandaging the Wounded), charcoal drawing.

== Awards ==
- 1956 – Sixth of April Award of Sarajevo
- 1962 – Twenty-seventh of July Award
- 1964 – Award of the Government of PR BiH
- 1970 – AVNOJ Award

== See also ==
- Association of Fine Artists of Bosnia and Herzegovina
- Analytical painting
