= Petar Šain =

Petar Šain (1885–1965) was a Bosnian artist. He was one of the first generation of art school-trained painters which included Gabrijel Jurkić, Petar Tiješić, Karlo Mijić, Špiro Bocarić, Đoko Mazalić, Roman Petrović and Lazar Drljača.

== Works ==
- The Tinsmith
