= Mogorjelo =

Coordinates: 43.0995°N 17.6997°E

- Могорјело
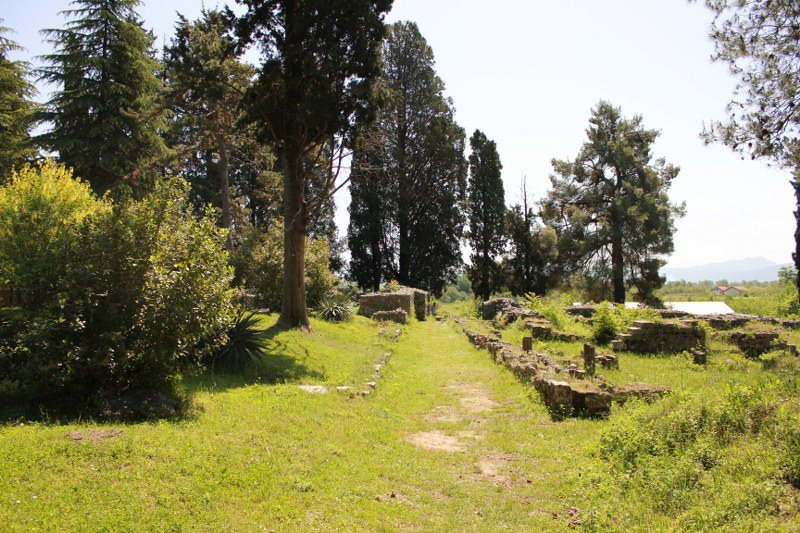

General information
- Type: villa rustica
- Architectural style: Roman
- Location: Čapljina, Bosnia and Herzegovina
- Completed: 4th century AD
- Owner: Bosnia and Herzegovina

KONS of Bosnia and Herzegovina
- Official name: The late-antique villa of Mogorjelo, the archaeological site
- Type: Category I historical monument
- Criteria: B, C, D, F, H i.
- Designated: 6 November 2002
- Reference no.: 186
- Decision no.: 01-273/02

Mogorjelo (Могорјело) is a Roman villa which dates back to the early 4th century AD. It is situated on a hill between the rivers Trebižat and Neretva, 5 km south of Čapljina, alongside the road to Gabela in Bosnia and Herzegovina. The area is currently protected by the state as a National Monument.

== History ==
An Italic settler had a private manor complex built for agricultural purposes on the Mogorjelo site in the mid first century CE. He located the building designed for processing agricultural produce (villa rustica fructuaria) on a salient on the hill (the ground plan of the villa lies near the north or main gate of the walls of later date), and the residential building (villa rustica habitatoria) on the south slope exposed to the sun. This building burned down in the third century. In the early fourth century, a state-owned estate was constructed over the ruins, with a villa which now forms the major feature of the complex. During the third century the property probably changed hands to become state-owned. The villa at Mogorjelo supplied the town of Narone, the ruins of which lie in the village of Vid near Metković. The estate was destroyed in a major fire. The latest coins discovered on this site, in a layer of soot, were minted by Honorius in 388, so that it may be assumed that Mogorjelo fell into enemy hands some time between 401 and 403 with the Visigoth invasion of these parts. Life continued in these new circumstances. In the mid fifth century, two basilicas were erected within the ruined perimeter walls in the north-eastern corner of the former villa, first one to the north and immediately thereafter the one to the south. To judge from various conversion works within the buildings, it appears that they were converted to residential use. Some items of Carolingian provenance, dating from the ninth century, have been found in the round tower and adjacent premises. Burials took place all over the site and its surroundings from the period of construction of late antique churches to the nineteenth century. The site is protected by the Commission to Preserve National Monuments as the National Monument.

== Tourism ==
Area is surrounded by a park and a horse farm. The nearby horse riding club was founded 2004 and attracts over 300,000 visitors per year.

== Gallery ==
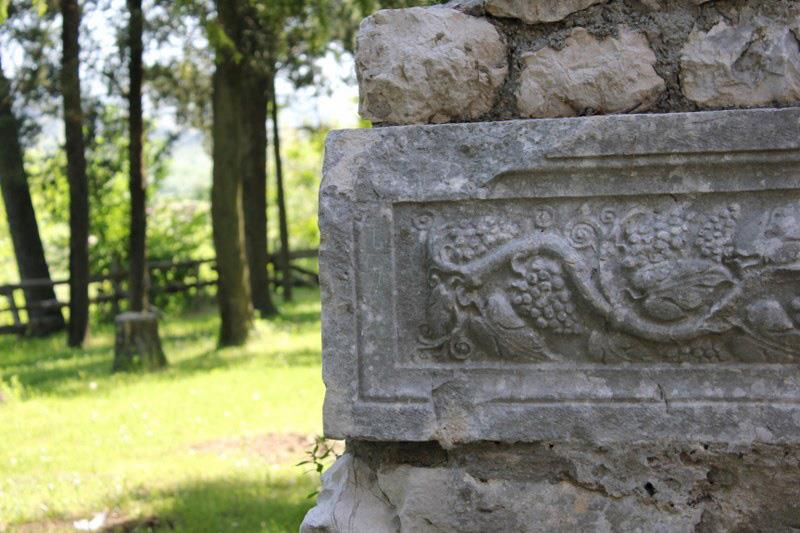
Detail from Mogorjelo

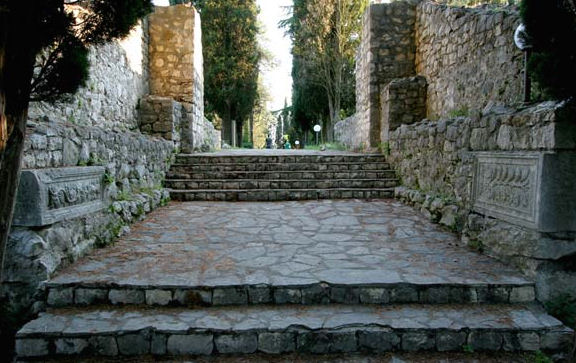
Mogorjelo ancient Roman suburban Villa Rustica from the 4th century, near Čapljina, Bosnia and Herzegovina

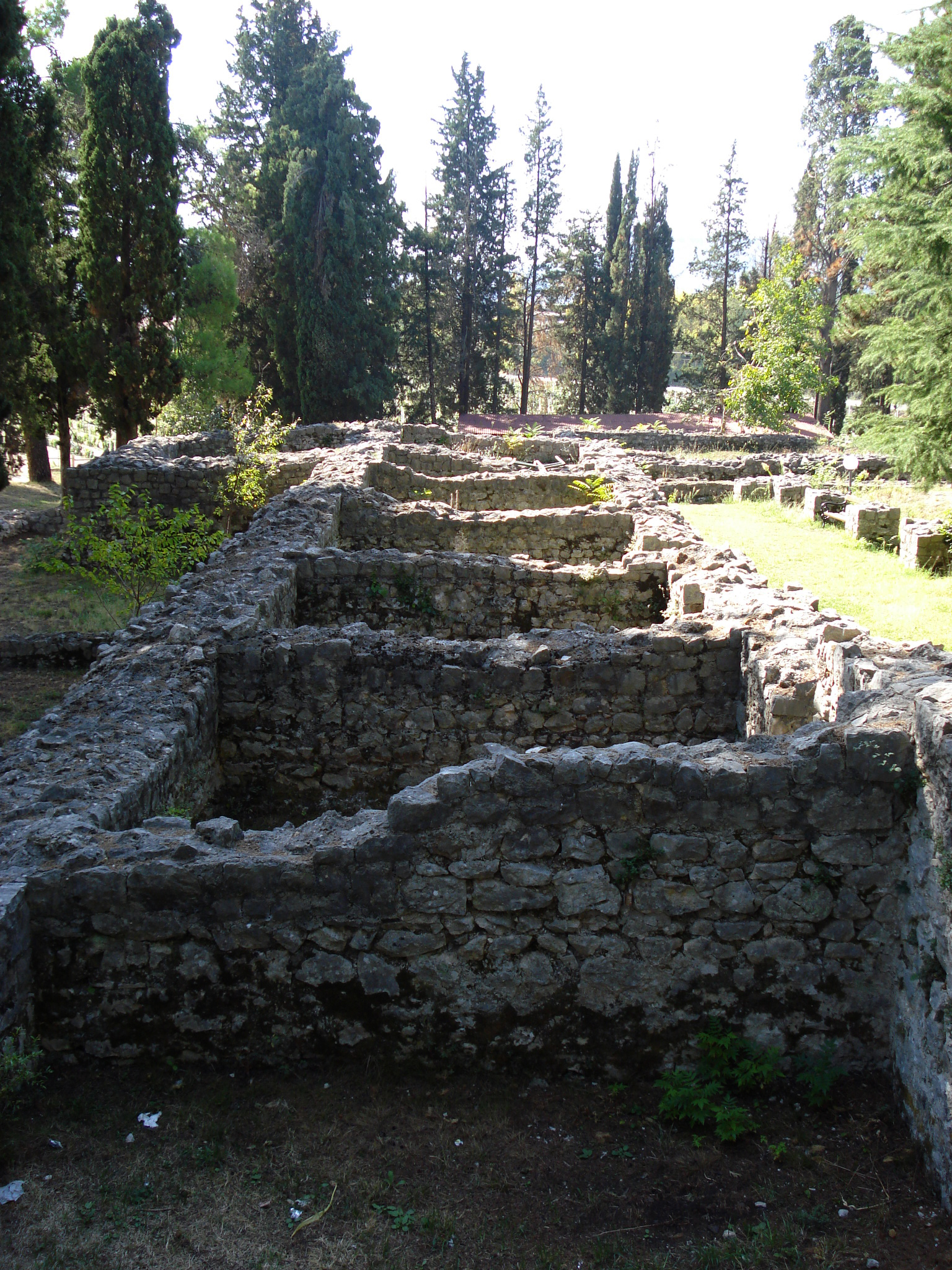
Mogorjelo ancient Roman suburban Villa Rustica from the 4th century, near Čapljina, Bosnia and Herzegovina

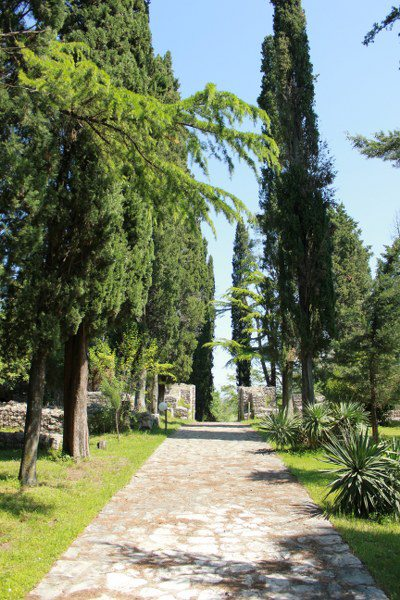
Mogorjelo St.
