= Mersad Berber =

Bosnia and Herzegovina artist (1940–2012)

- Born: Mersad Berber; 1 January 1940; Bosanski Petrovac, Vrbas Banovina, Kingdom of Yugoslavia
- Died: 7 October 2012 (aged 72); Zagreb, Croatia
- Occupation: Painter

Mersad Berber (1 January 1940 – 7 October 2012) was a Bosnian painter.

== Early life ==
Berber was born in Bosanski Petrovac, then part of the Kingdom of Yugoslavia. He trained at the Academy of Fine Arts in Ljubljana where he graduated with a BA and MA. In 1978, Berber received a teaching position at the Academy of Fine Arts in Sarajevo.

== Art ==
Today Berber is one of the best known graphic artists in the world. He was included in the Tate Gallery collection in 1984.

Throughout his career he created cycles of paintings which chronicle events, homages and dedications. Each cycle has its roots in Bosnian-Herzegovinian history from the medieval to the twentieth century. His works are characterized by the intermingling of ancient motifs with a more modern commentary, captivating in their iconic mystery and intensity. His surfaces are as complex as his subjects, combining techniques from various times and places while maintaining an aesthetic and allure that has drawn collectors for the past 40 years.

Berber was occupied with painting, graphic art, tapestry, illustrating and preparing bibliographic editions, graphic and poetic maps. His scenography and costume design came to life in theatres in Ljubljana, Zagreb, Sarajevo and Washington. In 1985 Berber finished Tempo Secondo, his own animated cartoon.

From 1992 until his death in October 2012 Berber resided and worked in both Zagreb and Dubrovnik.

== Awards ==
From 1966 on Berber received more than fifty awards. Among many international prizes he received:

- Gold Medal and Honorary Diploma at the First International Exhibition of Graphic Art in Trieste,
- first award at the 11th International Biennale in São Paulo,
- Honorary Prix at the 10th International Biennale of Graphic Art in Tokyo,
- first award at the 7th Mediterranean Biennale in Alexandria,
- ICOM award in Monte Carlo,
- the Kraków City award at the 4th International Biennale of graphic art, and
- the Lalit Kala Academy Grand Prix at the 5th Indian Triennale in New Delhi.

Kraków Grand Prix in 1997, an Ostend exhibition entitled "Between earth and heaven" and a recent one "Artist of the ideal" in Verona, selected by famous art critic Edward Lucie-Smith, confirmed Berber as one of the most significant contemporary artists. Comprehensive monography studies of Berber's art were published by Mladinska Knjiga, Ljubljana in 1980 and 1985, by Sol Intercontinental, Ljubljana in 1997 and by E&A Agency, Zagreb in 2000.
