= Karlo Mijić =

Yugoslav painter

- Born: 1887
- Died: 1964 (aged 76–77)
- Known for: Landscapes

Karlo Mijić (1887–1964) was a Yugoslav painter noted for his paintings of the Bosnian landscape.
