= Lazar Drljača =

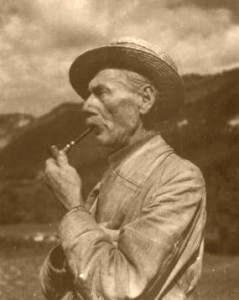
Lazar Drljača

Lazar Drljača (10 October 1882 – 13 July 1970) was a Bosnia and Herzegovina painter, who self-identified as the Bosnian bogumil.

== Biography ==
Born in Blatna near Bosanski Novi into a Bosnian Serb family, he was initially an expressionist, but turned to impressionism. Drljača identified himself as Bosnian bogumil, therefore he was often called the last Bosnian bogumil.

He passed his examination for Fine Arts in Vienna in October 1906, and in 1911 he participated in the International Exhibition in Rome for the Kingdom of Serbia's pavilion, after which he moved to Paris to attend art school, and worked in the Louvre copying the old masters, Titian and Leonardo da Vinci, sometimes to commission. From July 9, 1914 to 1919 little is known about his life but a note on a picture records that he was interned in a camp in Sardinia.

Just before the World War II, sometime around 1935, he returned to Bosnia for good and settled in a village Borci, on a karst plateau between Boračko jezero and Prenj mountain, above Konjic. He lived there for the rest of his life in seclusion, first in a village, and after he fell ill he moved to a nearby mountain villa, "Šantića Vila", above Boračko lake, where he would die in 1970. Although, at this point, in dilapidated state, "Šantića Vila" is also National Monument of Bosnia and Herzegovina.

== Works ==
- Three Horsemen
- The cabin of the painter, Blatina, October 1929, watercolor, 205 x 225

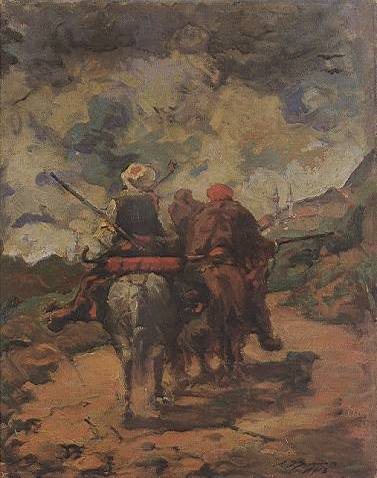
Three horsemen in Bosnia, Paris 1917.

== See also ==
- List of painters from Bosnia and Herzegovina
- Art of Yugoslavia
