= Roman Petrović =

Bosnian painter

Roman Petrović (1896, in Donji Vakuf – 1947) was a Yugoslav painter and writer. He belongs to the generation of artists who created the history of Bosnian-Herzegovinian (and Yugoslav) painting between the two world wars.

== Biography ==
Born to an ethnic Ukrainian-Polish family, he was a graduate of the Jan Matejko Academy of Fine Arts in Kraków, his expressionist art emphasises social themes, borrowing from diverse influences.

The Association of Artists of Bosnia and Herzegovina named its gallery, opened in 1980, Galerija Roman Petrović in honour of the painter. The gallery is a main venue for contemporary art and photography exhibitions.
