= Gabrijel Jurkić =

Bosnian Croat artist

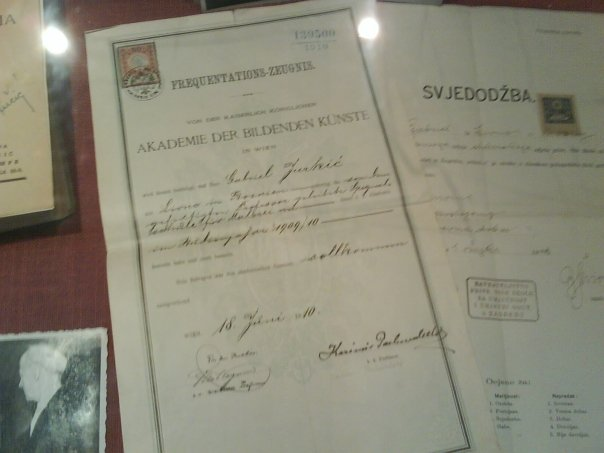
The certificate of Gabrijel Jurkić from Vienna Academy kept in Gorica museum in Livno

Gabrijel Jurkić (24 March 1886 – 25 February 1974) was a Bosnian Croat artist.

He was born in Livno, now Bosnia and Herzegovina. He studied in Zagreb before moving to Vienna, where he attended the Vienna Art Academy. He returned to Bosnia, living in Sarajevo until 1953 when he moved back to Livno. He would spend the rest of his life working within the local Franciscan monastery. He died in 1974.

In 1993, he appeared on a postage stamp issued by the Croat administration in Mostar.

There is a gallery dedicated to his work in Livno and his pictures are also displayed at the Museum of Contemporary Art in Zagreb.

== See also ==
- List of people on stamps of Bosnia and Herzegovina
