= Culture of Sarajevo =

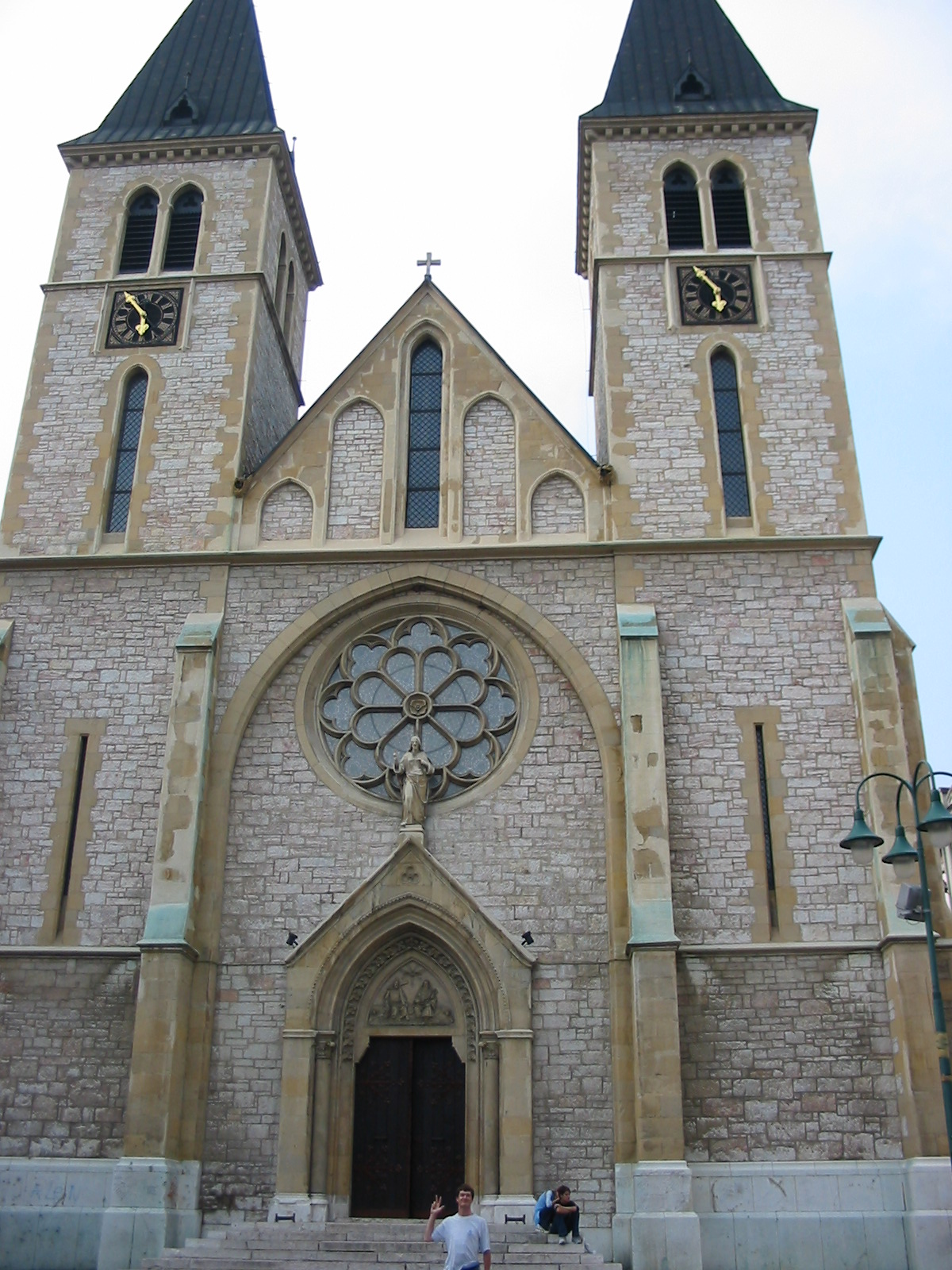
Cathedral of Jesus' Heart, in the center of Sarajevo.

The Culture of Sarajevo is represented in various ways.

Numerous cultural festivals occur every year, such as the Bašćaršija Nights, Sarajevo Winter Festival, and the Sarajevo Jazz Festival.

== Theatre ==
Numerous theatres are present in Sarajevo as well, such as the National Theatre of Sarajevo. The first ever Bosnian opera was held in Sarajevo in 2003. Theatres are also an important part of Sarajevo culture. The first great Sarajevo theatre was the national theatre of Bosnia and Herzegovina, built in 1919 and surviving to this day. Prior to that, plays were often held in parks or at the large houses of wealthy families. Sarajevo also houses the Sarajevo Youth Theatre.

== Libraries ==
Sarajevo also holds many of the most famous historical texts in Bosnia and Herzegovina. They were largely held in the Sarajevo City (and University) Library that was built in 1896. Unfortunately Serbian ultranationalists purposely fired upon the building with incendiary shells. They succeeded in setting the building on fire, and along with it thousands of irreplaceable texts. Today an international effort is underway to replace what was lost.

In Ottoman times, the Gazi Husrev-beg library was one of the largest and greatest in the Balkans. Destroyed since, it is currently being rebuilt in a stunning modern form that will house many of the oldest texts found in the city.

=== Writers ===
Historically, Sarajevo was home to several famous Bosnian writers, poets and thinkers. Nobel Prize-winner Ivo Andrić attended high school in Sarajevo for two years. Multiple award-winning writer Zlatko Topčić is from the city.

Sarajevo is also home to the Sarajevo Haggadah, one of the oldest surviving such texts, originating from the 14th century and brought by Jews fleeing the Spanish Inquisition. As of late, modern art has flourished in the city as well.

Contemporary poet Semezdin Mehmedinović wrote Sarajevo Blues from inside the city during the siege of Sarajevo in 1992.

== Cultural institutions ==
Sarajevo is home to a number of cultural institutions dedicated to upkeeping the city's culture. The notable Bosniak institute is housed in an impressive building in central Sarajevo, and features various interesting exhibits dealing with the city's and country's culture and history. Also notable are the International Center for Kids and Youth in New Sarajevo and the Center for Sarajevo Culture.

The most famous in all of Bosnia and Herzegovina, the National Museum of Bosnia and Herzegovina, is located in central Sarajevo. It was established in 1888, from an idea dating back to the first half of the 19th century. The Sarajevo Haggadah is held there. While in Sarajevo one can also visit the Ars Aevi Museum of Contemporary Art, the Historical Museum of Bosnia and Herzegovina, the Museum of the City of Sarajevo, the War Childhood Museum and the Bosnian and Herzegovinian Museum of Literature. There existed an impressive Olympic museum dedicated to the 84 games, but it was destroyed in warfare. Part of the exhibition has been relocated to a small exhibition hall on the site of the Zetra Stadium.

== Music ==
An interesting aspect of the city's culture is its rich musical history. Many regard it as the most musically influential city in the Balkans, especially during the 20th century. "Kad ja pođoh na Benbašu" is a great example of traditional Bosnian music, and it is one of the city's unofficial anthems. The city is home to the Sarajevo Philharmonic Orchestra.

During the second half of the 20th century, Sarajevo was a center of Yugoslav pop and rock music. Some of the bands from the Sarajevo school of pop rock, such as Bijelo Dugme and Indeksi, are arguably the greatest Yugoslav rock bands of all time. After them come a wide array of other bands and performers considered "greats" and "legends", such as Crvena Jabuka, Plavi Orkestar, Zabranjeno Pušenje, and others. Solo artists such as Kemal Monteno and Dino Merlin also gained much prominence. Monteno's song, "Sarajevo Ljubavi Moja" (Sarajevo Love of Mine), is another unofficial anthem of Sarajevo. Sarajevo is also the hometown of one of the most significant ex-Yugoslavian alternative industrial-noise bands, SCH.

== Cinema ==
The Sarajevo Film Festival has been held since 1995 and has become the premier film festival in the Balkans. Largely due to its size and the success and popularity of cinema in Bosnia, the event has gained considerable importance and often attracts foreign celebrities. The Sarajevo Winter Festival is also well-known, as are the Bašćaršija Nights, a month-long showcase of local culture, music, and dance.

The city is also present internationally in various forms of pop culture. The film "Welcome to Sarajevo" was released in 1997. The Irish rock band U2 had a hit song with Miss Sarajevo, and progressive metal group Savatage's 1995 Concept Album "Dead Winter Dead" deals with the story of Sarajevo's Romeo and Juliet. Sarajevo is also the name of a jam band from East Windsor, New Jersey.

== See also ==
- Architecture of Bosnia and Herzegovina
- List of National Monuments of Bosnia and Herzegovina
- List of World Heritage Sites in Bosnia and Herzegovina
- List of Museums in Bosnia and Herzegovina
- Folklore of Sarajevo
- Tourism in Bosnia and Herzegovina
