= Tourism in Bosnia and Herzegovina =

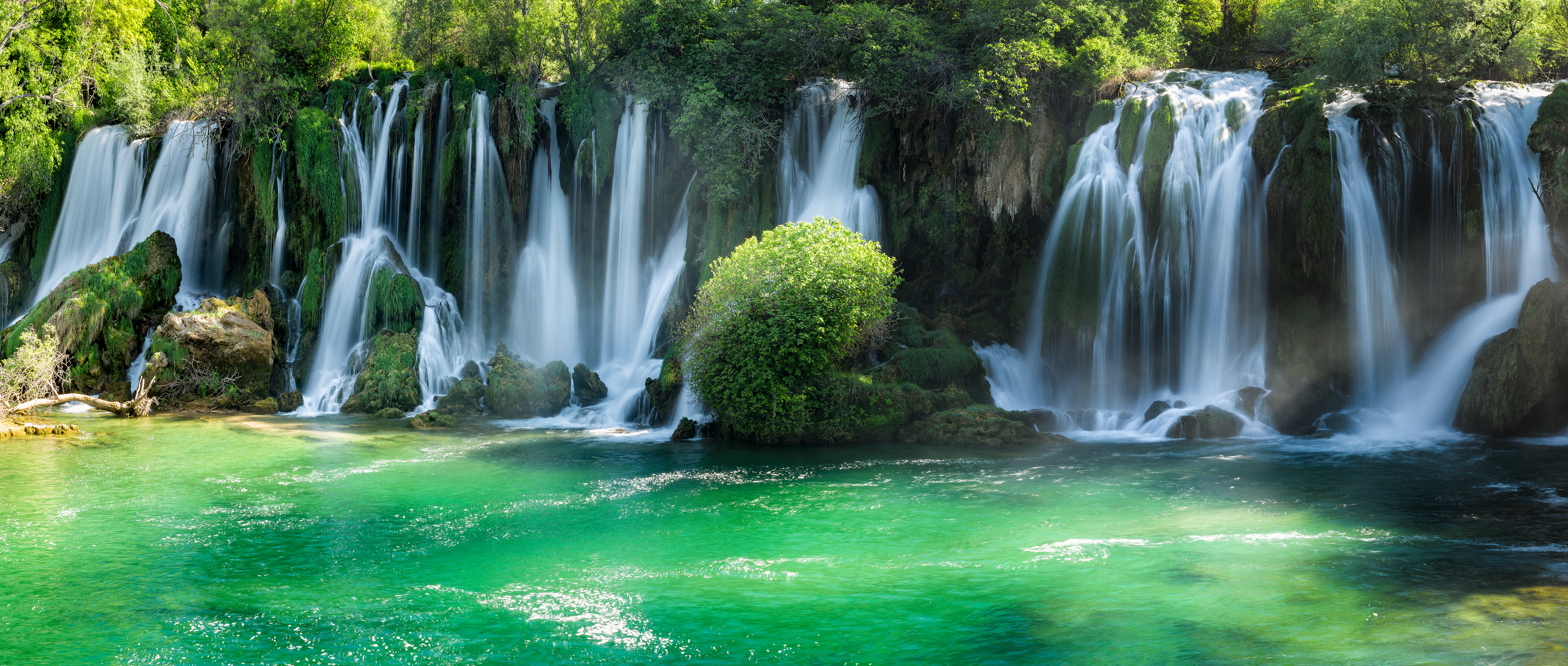
Kravica Waterfalls

Tourism in Bosnia and Herzegovina is a major industry and an important sector of the country's economy. Since the end of the Bosnian War, tourism has become one of the fastest-growing sectors of the economy, contributing significantly to employment and regional development. Bosnia and Herzegovina is increasingly integrated into the European tourism market, attracting visitors with its cultural heritage, natural landscapes, religious sites, winter sports, and adventure tourism. Tourism is concentrated in Sarajevo and Mostar, as well as the Olympic mountain resorts of Jahorina, Bjelašnica, and Igman, with peak seasons during the summer and winter months.

The history of tourism in Bosnia and Herzegovina dates to the Austro-Hungarian period and expanded during the Yugoslav era, particularly after Sarajevo hosted the 1984 Winter Olympics. Tourism declined during the Bosnian War before recovering steadily in the early 2000s through reconstruction and increasing international recognition. In 2019, Bosnia and Herzegovina recorded 1.99 million tourist arrivals and 4.1 million overnight stays, with foreign visitors accounting for nearly three-quarters of all tourists.

Bosnia and Herzegovina contains five World Heritage Sites and four national parks, alongside several nature parks and protected landscapes.

== Economy and tourism ==
Tourism contributes to the Bosnian economy. As a result, Bosnia-Herzegovina now has a wide tourist industry and a fast expanding service sector due to the increasing annual growth in tourists. The country also benefits from being both a summer and winter destination with continuity in its tourism throughout the year.

Being a predominantly mountainous country Bosnia-Herzegovina provides some of the best-value ski vacations in Europe. In March 2012, Sarajevo won travel blog Foxnomad's "Best City to Visit" competition, beating out more than one hundred cities around the entire world.

More recently, the town of Visoko has experienced a staggering increase in tourist arrivals due to the alleged discovery of the Bosnian pyramids, attracting in excess of 10,000 tourists in the first weekend of June 2006.

Međugorje has become one of the most popular pilgrimage sites for Catholics (and people of other faiths) in the world and has turned into Europe's third most important religious place, where each year more than 1 million people visit. It has been estimated that 30 million pilgrims have come to Međugorje since the reputed apparitions began in 1981.

Neum on the adriatic coast has steep hills, sandy beaches, and several large tourist hotels. Prices tend to be lower than in neighboring Croatia, making it popular with shoppers. Tourism and the commerce it brings, is the leading contributor to the economy of the area. Tourism in Neum is active mostly in the coastal region. The inland area behind Neum has a rich archeological history and untouched wilderness and is starting to develop agricultural tourism.

Vacationing in Bosnia has become popular among Gulf Arabs from Eastern Arabia.

== Tourist attractions ==
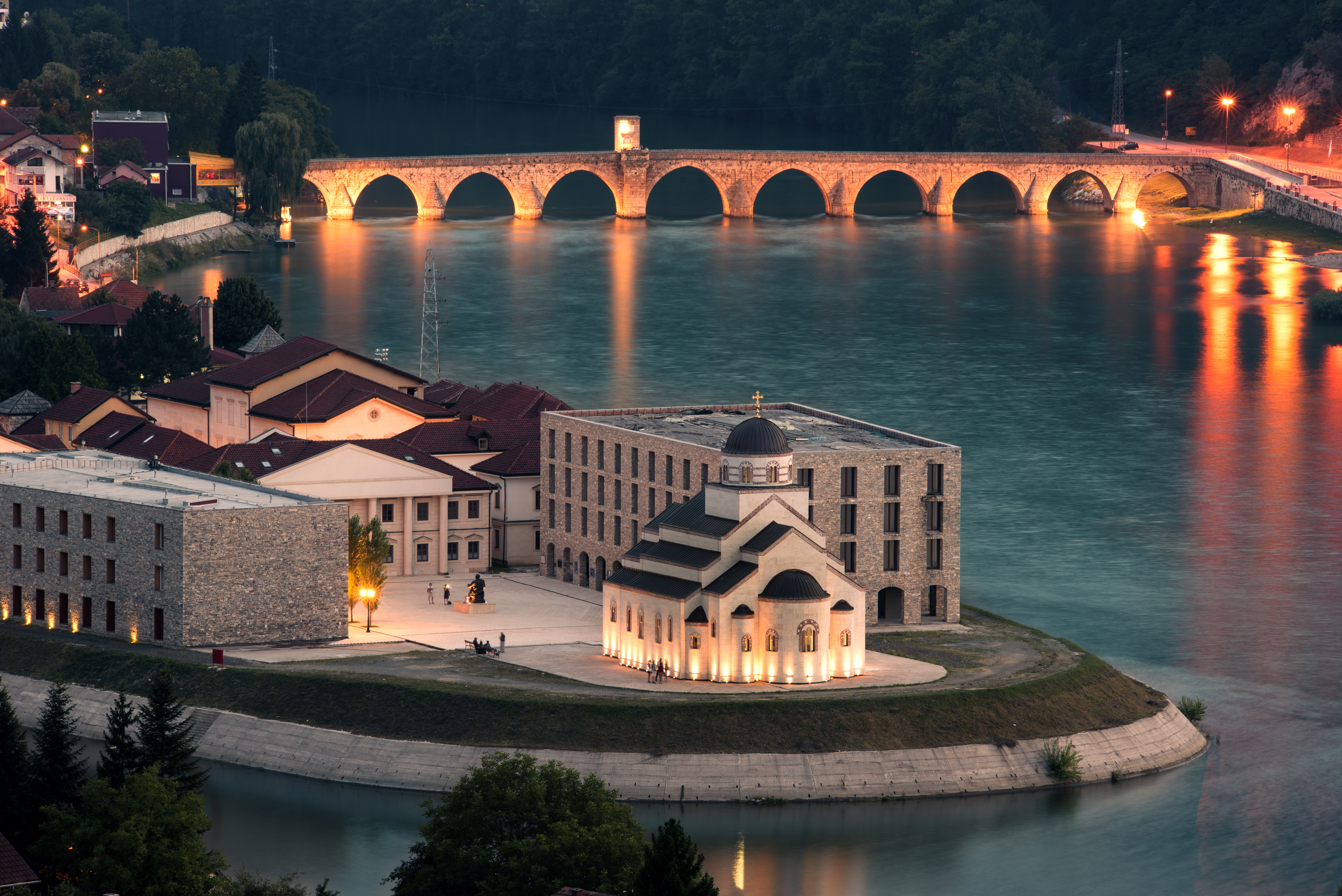
Andrićgrad and Mehmed Paša Sokolović Bridge, a UNESCO World Heritage Site

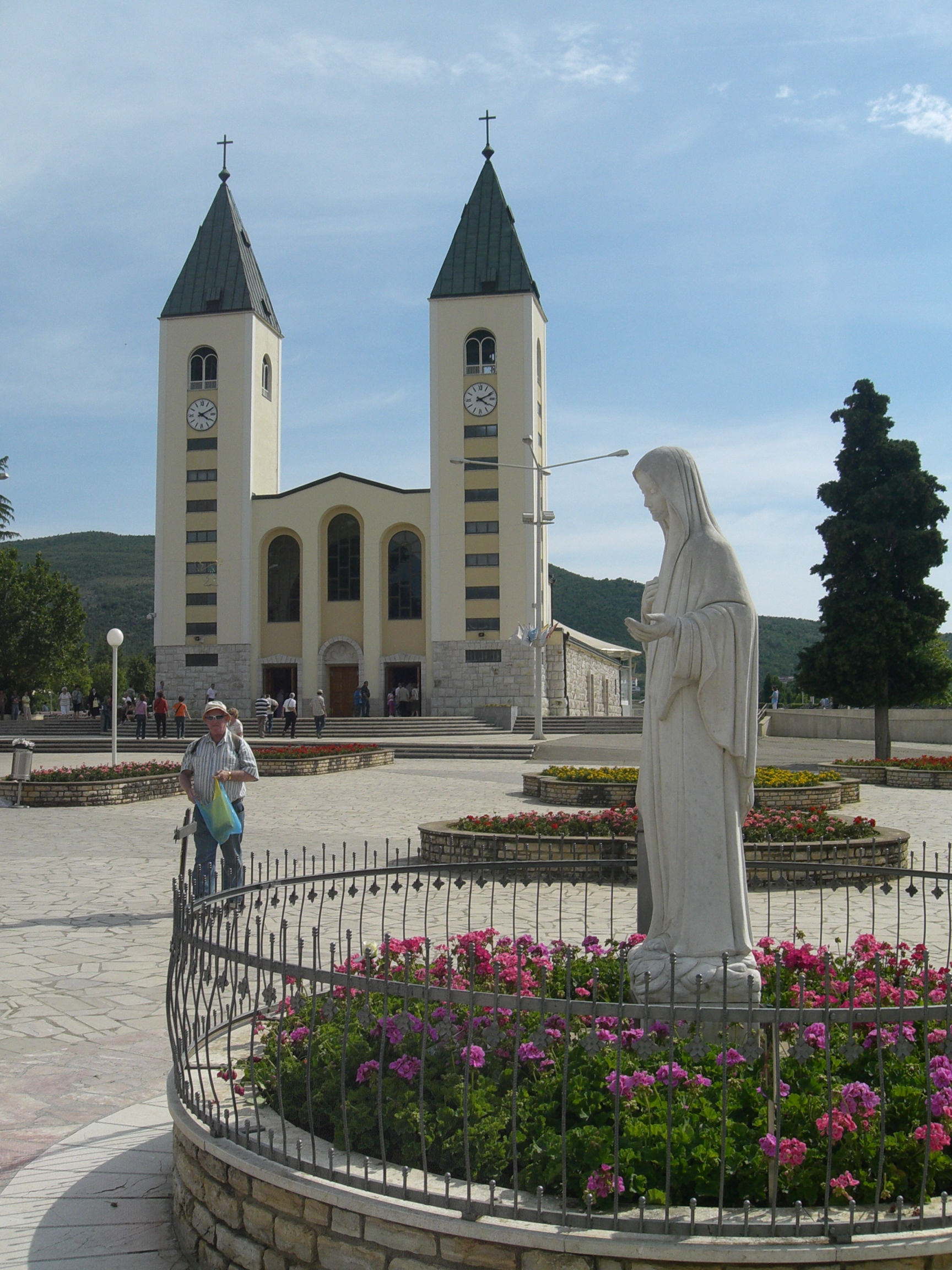
The Marian shrine of Our Lady of Medjugorje is currently one of the biggest tourist attractions in Bosnia and Herzegovina

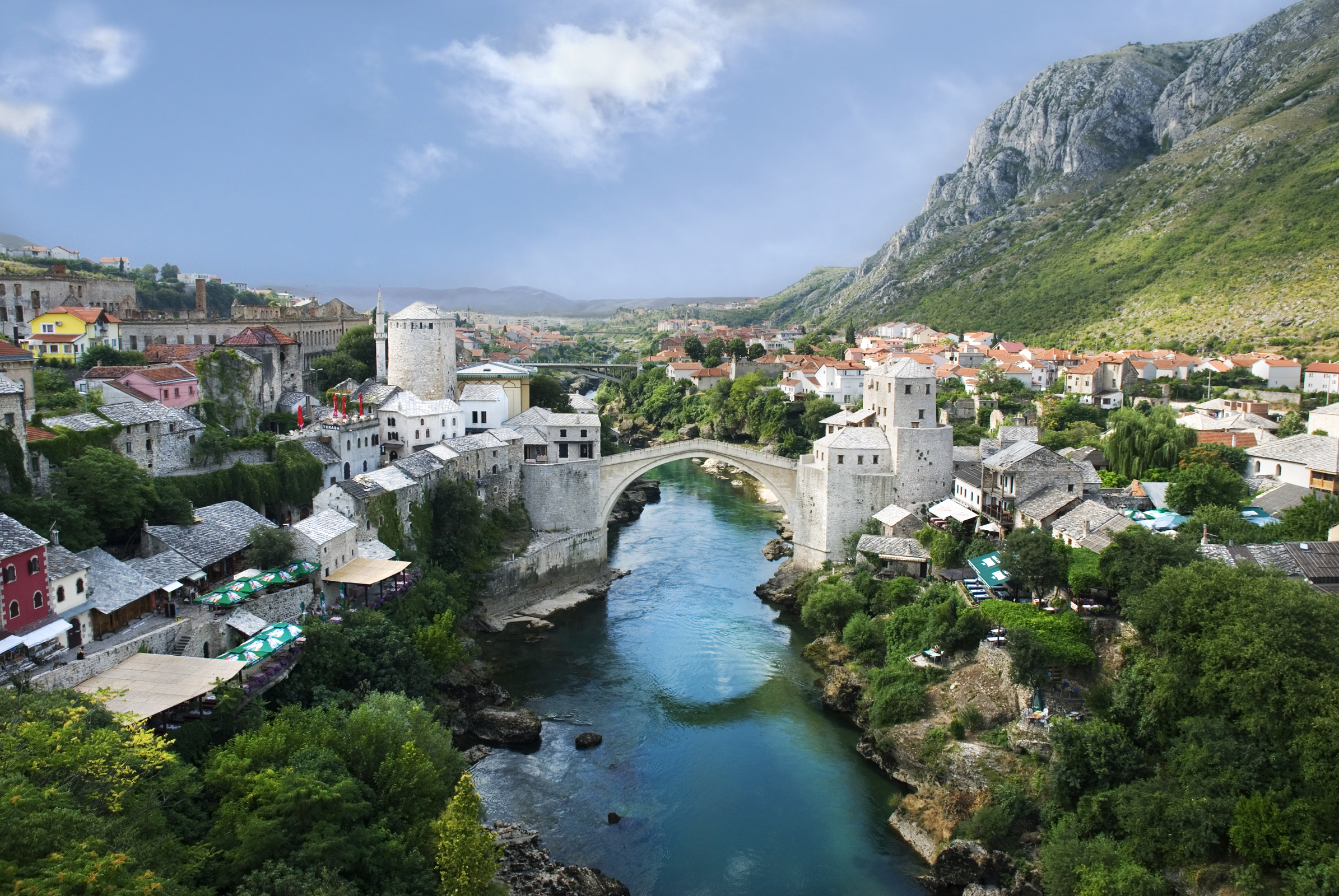
Stari Most in Mostar, a UNESCO World Heritage Site

The tourist department of Bosnia and Herzegovina indicated that the most attractive benefits experienced by visitors are - 1) the spirit of the people. 2) Cities across the country are well connected with intercity busses and 3) major cities with the surrounding natural sites are easily reachable within a day.

Some of the tourist attractions in Bosnia and Herzegovina include:

- Sarajevo The "Olympic City". Economic, scientific, cultural, political and commercial center of Bosnia-Herzegovina. Called The European Jerusalem.
- Mostar, "City on Neretva", "City of Sunshine", the UNESCO site of Stari most and old town Mostar;
- Tuzla Birthplace of Mesa Selimovic and known for its Pannonian "Salt lakes".
- Banja Luka, the "Green City" with various cultural sights like Kastel fortress, the river Vrbas and Ferhadija mosque;
- Bihać and the river Una with its waterfalls and the Una National Park;
- Zenica the river Bosna and Vranduk – the medieval fortress with a mosque;
- Jajce with its waterfalls, city of The Bosnian Kings, and location of the foundation of Yugoslavia during AVNOJ;
- Višegrad, the UNESCO site of the Mehmed Paša Sokolović Bridge;
- Slatina, a famous spa resort with unpolluted nature, fresh air and a reputation since the 1870s.
- Medjugorje, Catholic pilgrimage site of a Marian apparition; known for Our Lady of Medjugorje.
- Prijedor, Old City Mosque (National heritage), Kozara National Park and Bosnia's largest WWII monument at Mrakovica;
- The Neretva river and the Rakitnica river canyons in Upper Neretva;
- The Trebižat river and its waterfalls Kravice and Kočuša;
- The Buna and its spring Vrelo Bune with the historical town of Blagaj;
- The Lower Tara river canyon;
- The Perućica ancient forest, one of the last two remaining primeval forests in Europe, and the Sutjeska river canyon, both within Sutjeska National Park;
- The Ribnik river fly fishing;
- The Pliva river fly fishing;
- The Una river and National Park rafting, fly fishing;
- Mount Bjelašnica and Jahorina, sites of the XIV Olympic Winter Games;
- Srebrenica nature, rafting on Drina, boat rides through canyon of river Drina to Višegrad (second deepest canyon in Europe), also a place where some of the worst war crimes committed in war happened;
- Mogorjelo, a Roman villa rustica that dates from the early fourth century. It is situated 5 km south of Čapljina.
- Neum, the only Bosnian-Herzegovinan coastal city on the Adriatic.
- Doboj and its 13th-century fortress;
- Stolac, the Begovina neighborhood and Radimlja tombstones;
- Visoko, City of Bosnian Kings and site of the alleged Bosnian pyramids;
- Tešanj, one of the oldest cities in Bosnia with its old town;
- Bijeljina, known for its agriculture and Etno village Stanišić.
- Lukavac - Modrac Lake (Jezero Modrac) the largest artificial lake in Bosnia and Herzegovina
- Travnik - The birthplace of Ivo Andrić and site of old town Travnik
- Ostrožac Castle - 16th-century castle built by the Ottomans and a second addition added by the Habsburg family.
- Konjic - known for its old town including the Stara Ćuprija bridge.
- Počitelj - a historic village near Čapljina.

== World Heritage Sites ==
The United Nations Educational, Scientific and Cultural Organization (UNESCO) has included the following 5 sites from Bosnia and Herzegovina on its World Heritage List:

Site	Image	Location(s)	Description	Shared with	Ref(s)
Old Bridge Area of the Old City of Mostar		Mostar	The historic town of Mostar developed during the Ottoman and Austro-Hungarian periods and is best known for the Stari Most (Old Bridge). Destroyed during the Bosnian War, the bridge was rebuilt under UNESCO supervision as a symbol of reconciliation.	—	
Mehmed Paša Sokolović Bridge in Višegrad		Višegrad	Built in the late 16th century by Ottoman architect Mimar Sinan, the Mehmed Paša Sokolović Bridge spans the Drina river with 11 stone arches. It is regarded as one of the finest examples of classical Ottoman bridge architecture.	—	
Stećci Medieval Tombstones Graveyards		Radimlja, Grčka Glavica, Krekovi, Borak, Novi Travnik, Blidinje, Kalinovik, Baljci, Bijača, Kladanj, Olovo, Goražde, Stolac, Trnovo, Sokolac, Berkovići, Šekovići, Foča, Kalinovik, Kupres	This transnational UNESCO site includes 28 medieval cemeteries across Bosnia and Herzegovina, Croatia, Montenegro, and Serbia. Dating from the 12th to 16th centuries, the limestone stećci are decorated with distinctive carvings and inscriptions reflecting medieval Balkan culture.	Croatia, Montenegro, Serbia	
Ancient and Primeval Beech Forests of the Carpathians and Other Regions of Europe		Janj forest, Šipovo	This transboundary extension of the World Heritage site of the Primeval Beech Forests of the Carpathians and the Ancient Beech Forests of Germany (Germany, Slovakia, Ukraine) stretches over 18 countries.	17 countries	
Vjetrenica Cave		Ravno	Located in the Dinaric Alps, Vjetrenica Cave is renowned for its exceptional underground biodiversity and high number of endemic species. It is one of the world's most important habitats for cave-dwelling animals and contains numerous rare and ancient relict species.	—	

The 9 monuments and areas seeking a nomination as World Heritage Sites, currently placed on the Tentative List include:

- Sarajevo - unique symbol of universal multiculture - continual open city (N.I.) (1997)
- The natural and architectural ensemble of Jajce (2006)
- The historic urban site of Počitelj (2007)
- The natural and architectural ensemble of Blagaj (2007)
- The natural and architectural ensemble of Stolac (2007)
- Jewish cemetery in Sarajevo (2018)
- Complex of travertine waterfalls in Martin Brod - Una National Park (2019)

== Winter sports ==
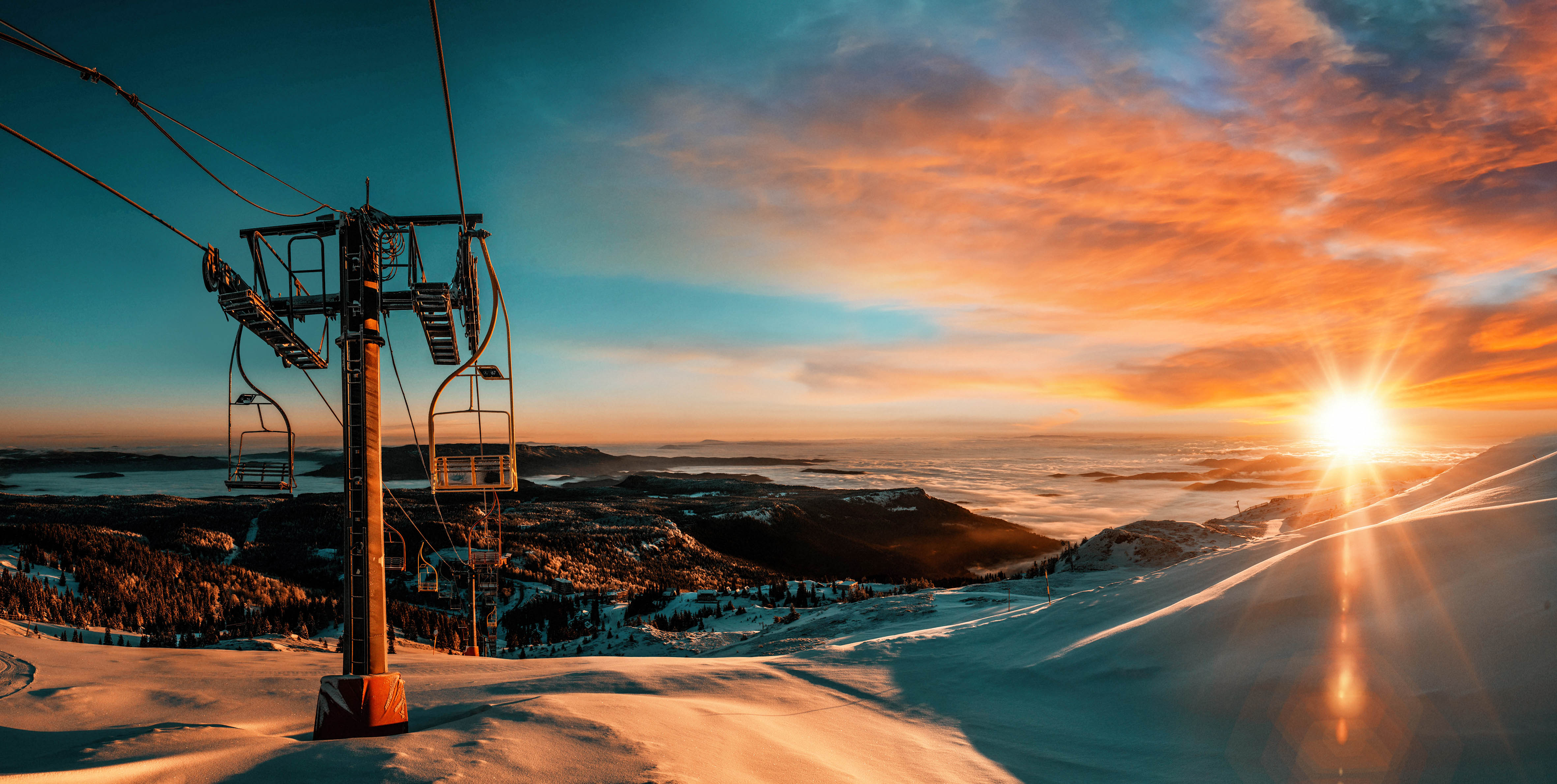
Jahorina ski resort is the biggest in Bosnia and Herzegovina

During the 1984 Winter Olympics, the mountains of Bjelašnica, Jahorina and Igman hosted the skiing events. These are the most visited skiing mountains in Bosnia-Herzegovina.

Jahorina ski resort was the site of the women's alpine skiing events. The men's alpine events were held at Bjelašnica. At Igman The Malo Polije area hosted the ski jumping and the ski jumping part of the Nordic combined events. Meanwhile, the Veliko Polje hosted the biathlon, cross-country skiing, and the cross-country skiing part of the Nordic combined event.

Sarajevo hosted the European Youth Olympic Winter Festival in 2019 and due to this, investments were made to build modern ski lifts and good standards of accommodation, especially at Bjelašnica and Jahorina.

The mountain Vlašić has also become a major center for winter tourism due to its excellent accommodation for skiing, snowboarding and other winter sports. It is also a destination for summer and eco tourism with many hiking trails and undisturbed wilderness areas.

The mountain and National Park Kozara has over the past years also become a tourist attraction for skiing and hiking.

== Regions and cities ==
Bosnia-Herzegovina is known for having various cultural sites of mixed architecture with Roman, medieval, Ottoman and Austro-Hungarian influences.

=== Sarajevo ===
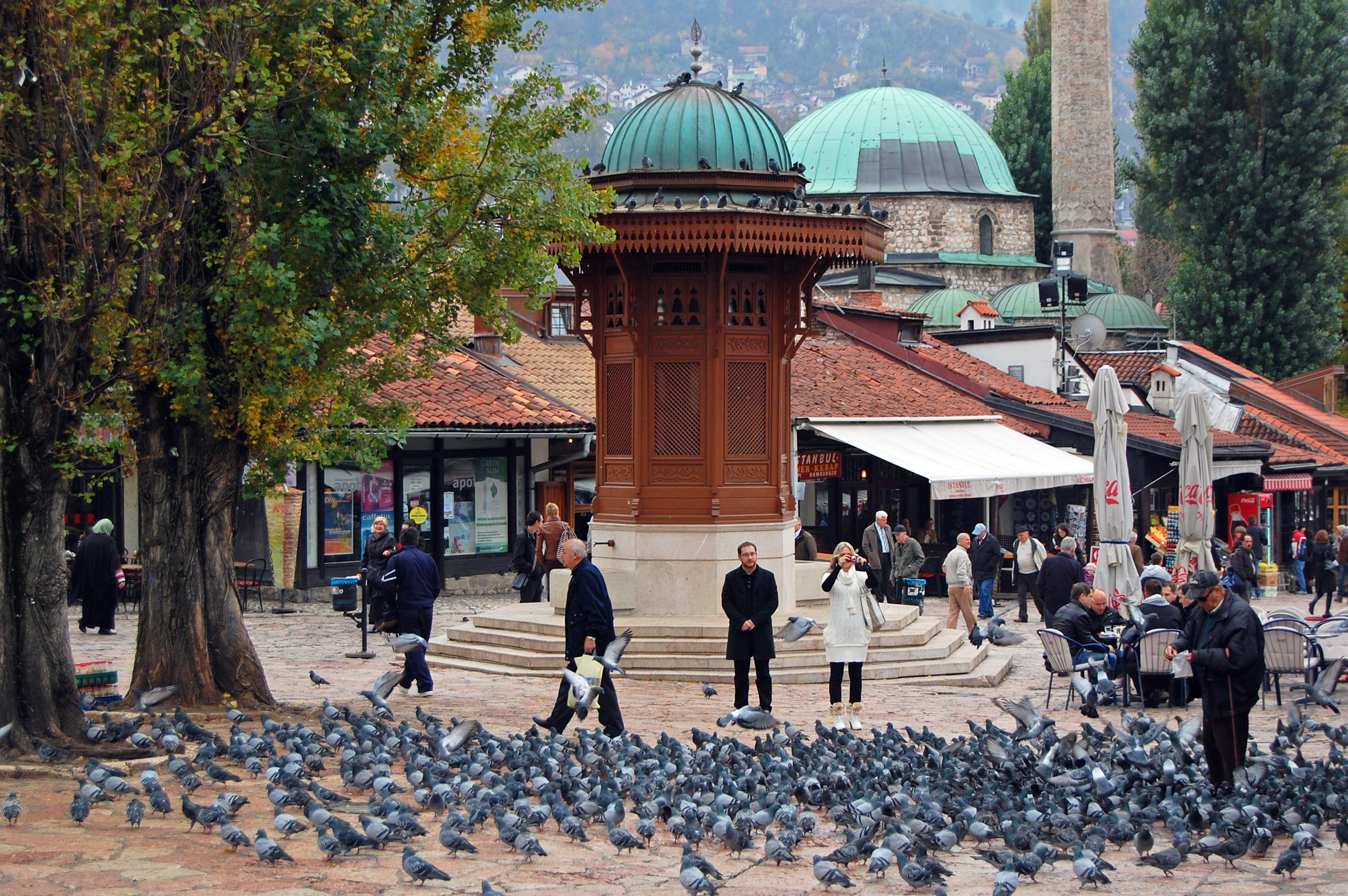
Old town of Baščaršija and Sebilj fountain

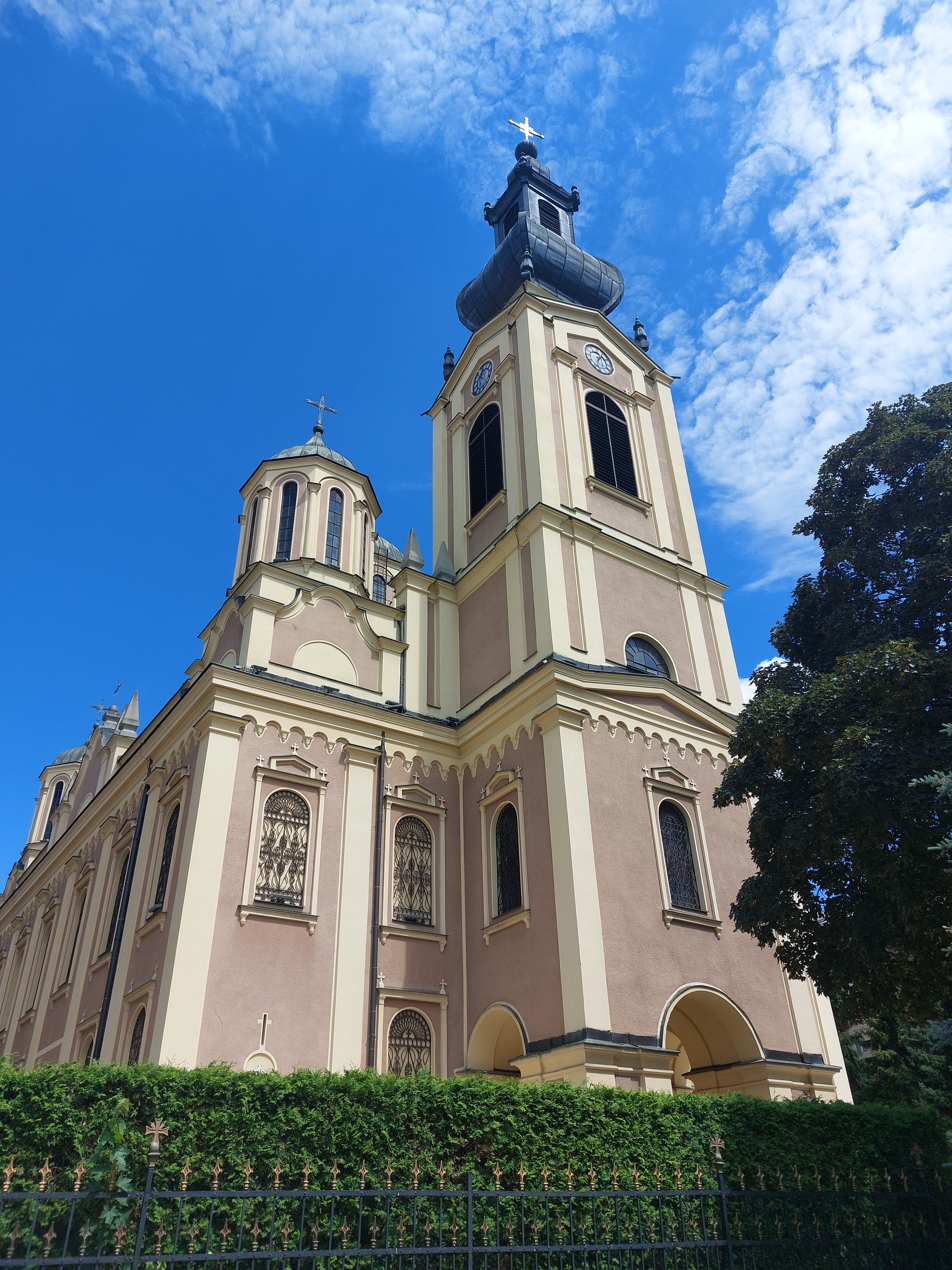
Cathedral of the Nativity of the Theotokos

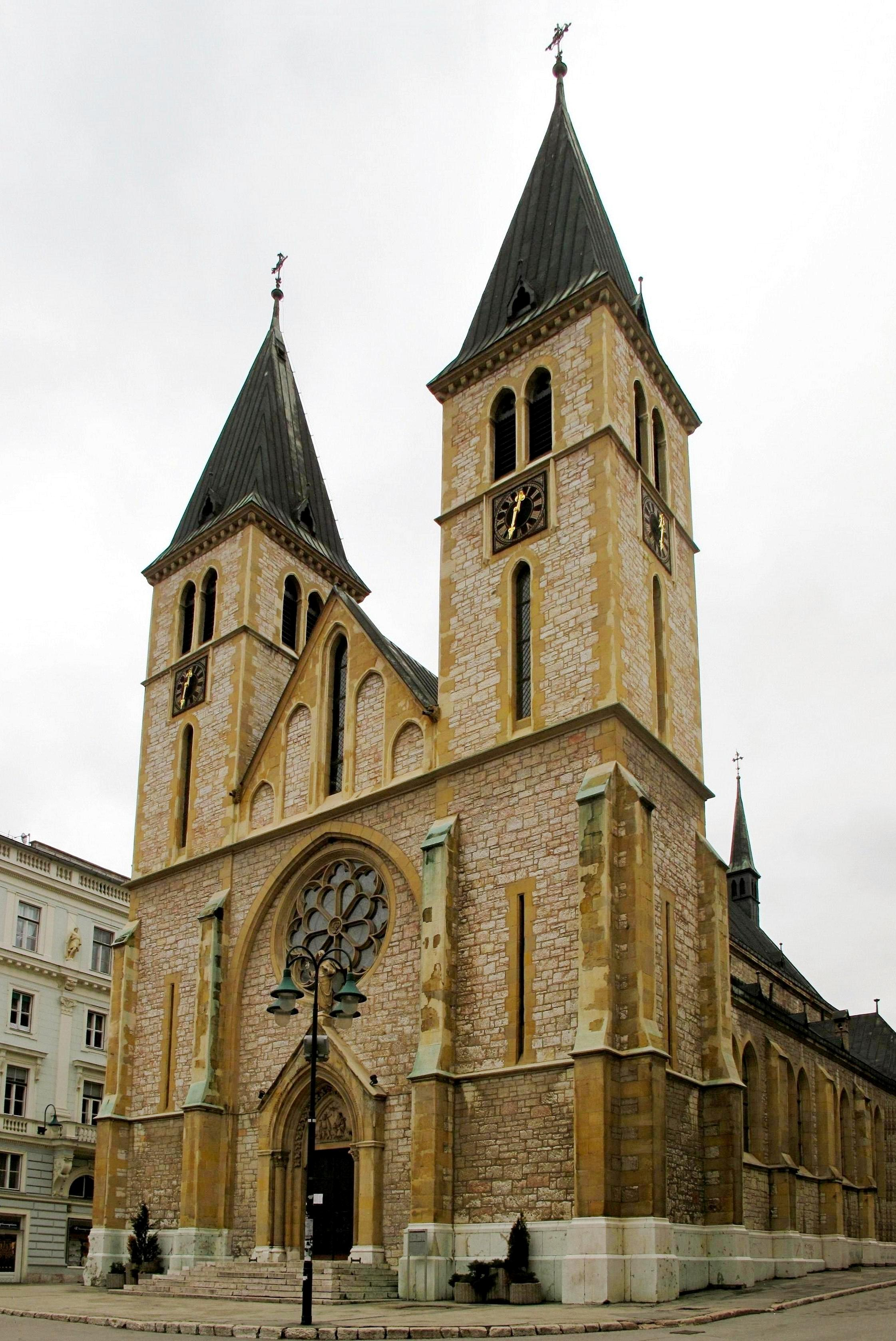
Sacred Heart Cathedral

The capital city Sarajevo is known for its traditional religious diversity, with adherents of Islam, Orthodoxy, Catholicism and Judaism coexisting there for centuries. Due to this long and rich history of religious diversity, Sarajevo has often been called the "Jerusalem of Europe"

Sarajevo has a strong tourist industry and was named by Lonely Planet one of the top 50 "Best City in the World" in 2006. In December 2009 listed Sarajevo as one of the top ten cities to visit in 2010.

Sports-related tourism uses the legacy facilities of the 1984 Winter Olympics, especially the skiing facilities on the nearby mountains of Bjelašnica, Igman, Jahorina, Trebević, and Treskavica. Sarajevo's 600 years of history, influenced by both Western and Eastern empires, is also a strong tourist attraction. Sarajevo has hosted travellers for centuries, because it was an important trading centre during the Ottoman and Austria-Hungarian empires. Examples of popular destinations in Sarajevo include the Vrelo Bosne park with Roman thermal springs, the Sarajevo cathedral, the Gazi Husrev-beg's Mosque and old town of Sarajevo; Baščaršija. Tourism in Sarajevo is chiefly focused on historical, religious, and cultural aspects.

The city is rich in museums, including the Museum of Sarajevo, the Ars Aevi Museum of Contemporary Art, Historical Museum of Bosnia and Herzegovina, The Museum of Literature and Theatre Arts of Bosnia and Herzegovina, and the National Museum of Bosnia and Herzegovina (established in 1888) home to the Sarajevo Haggadah, an illuminated manuscript and the oldest Sephardic Jewish document in the world issued in Barcelona around 1350, containing the traditional Jewish Haggadah, is held at the museum.

The city also hosts the National theatre of Bosnia and Herzegovina, established in 1919, as well as the Sarajevo Youth Theatre. Other cultural institutions include the Centre for Sarajevo Culture, Sarajevo City Library, Art Gallery of Bosnia and Herzegovina, and the Bosniak Institute, a privately owned library and art collection focusing on Bosniak history.

The Sarajevo Film Festival, established in 1995, has become the premier film festival in the Balkans. The Sarajevo Winter Festival, Sarajevo Jazz Festival and Sarajevo International Music Festival are well-known, as is the Baščaršija Nights festival, a month-long showcase of local culture, music, and dance.

The Sarajevo Film Festival has been hosted at the National Theater, with screenings at the Open-air theatre Metalac and the Bosnian Cultural Center, all located in central Sarajevo and has hosted many world-renowned actors, directors and musicians.

The first incarnation of the Sarajevo Film Festival was hosted in still-warring Sarajevo in 1995, and has now progressed into being the biggest and most significant festival in South-Eastern Europe. A talent campus is also held during the duration of the festival, with numerous world-renowned lecturers speaking on behalf of world cinematography and holding workshops for film students from across South-Eastern Europe.

The Sarajevo Jazz Festival takes place at the Bosnian Cultural Centre (aka "Main Stage"), just down the street from the SFF, at the Sarajevo Youth Stage Theatre (aka "Strange Fruits Stage"), at the Dom Vojske Federacije (aka "Solo Stage"), and at the CDA (aka "Groove Stage").

=== Central Bosnia ===
Visoko gained interest from tourists since claims made by Semir Osmanagić about existence of pyramids in that city, a pseudoscientific theory that has been debunked by scientists. He subsequently made shift toward tourism and alleged healing aspect of the tunnels in park Ravne. Visoko is home to tens of thousands tourist yearly since 2006 when the claims were made. Multiple visits to the park and Visočica hill by Serbian tennis player Novak Đoković served a major tourism boost for the area as he hailed the park as "paradise on earth." Other notable visitors include Vlade Divac, Jusuf Nurkić, Amel Tuka, Damir Džumhur, Mirza Teletović, pop singer Goran Karan who also recorded a video for his song in the park, Bosnia national team, Branko Đurić, and others. Osmanagić also claimed that around 92.000 visitors came to the park in 2020.

=== Mostar and Herzegovina ===
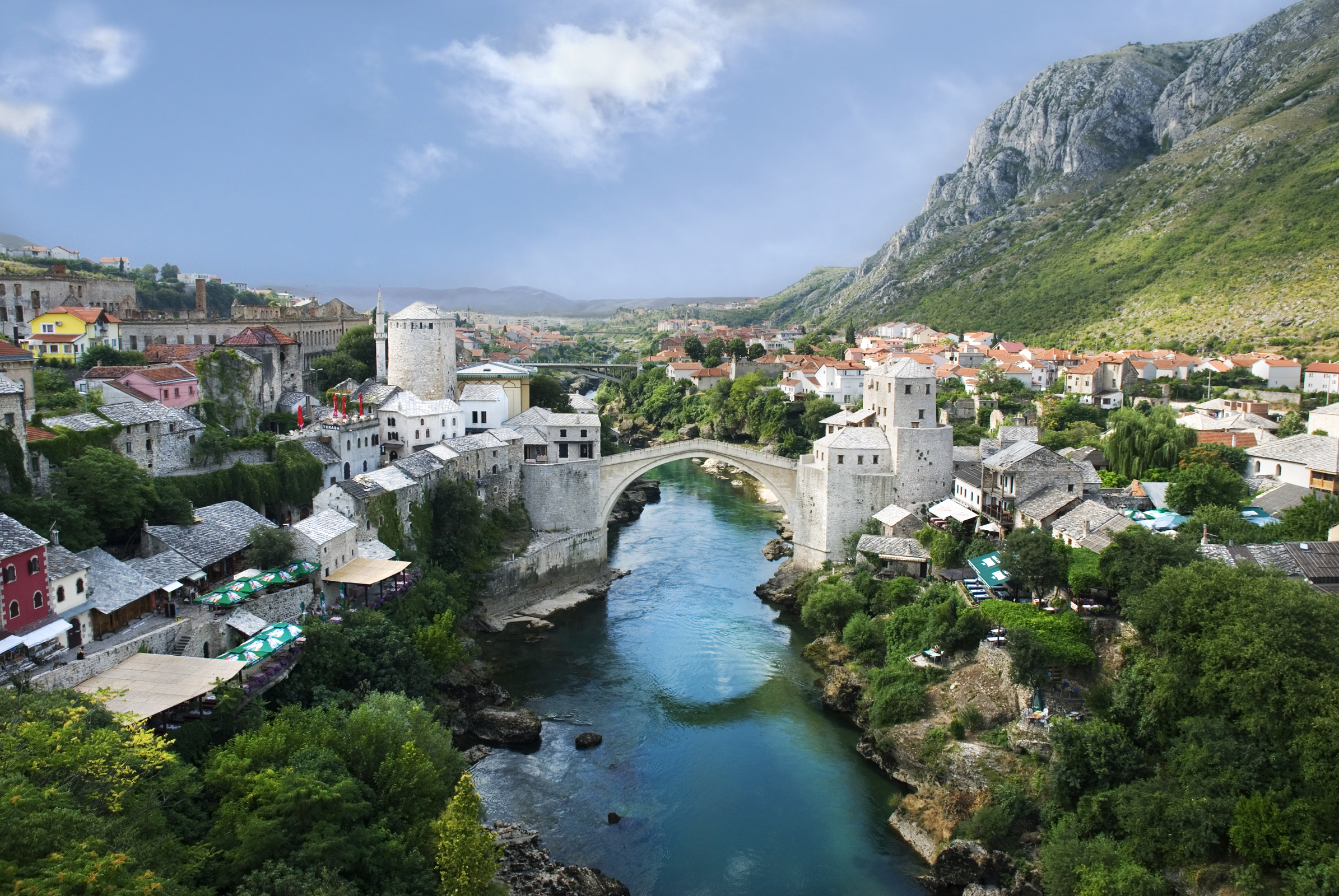
View of the Old Town of Mostar

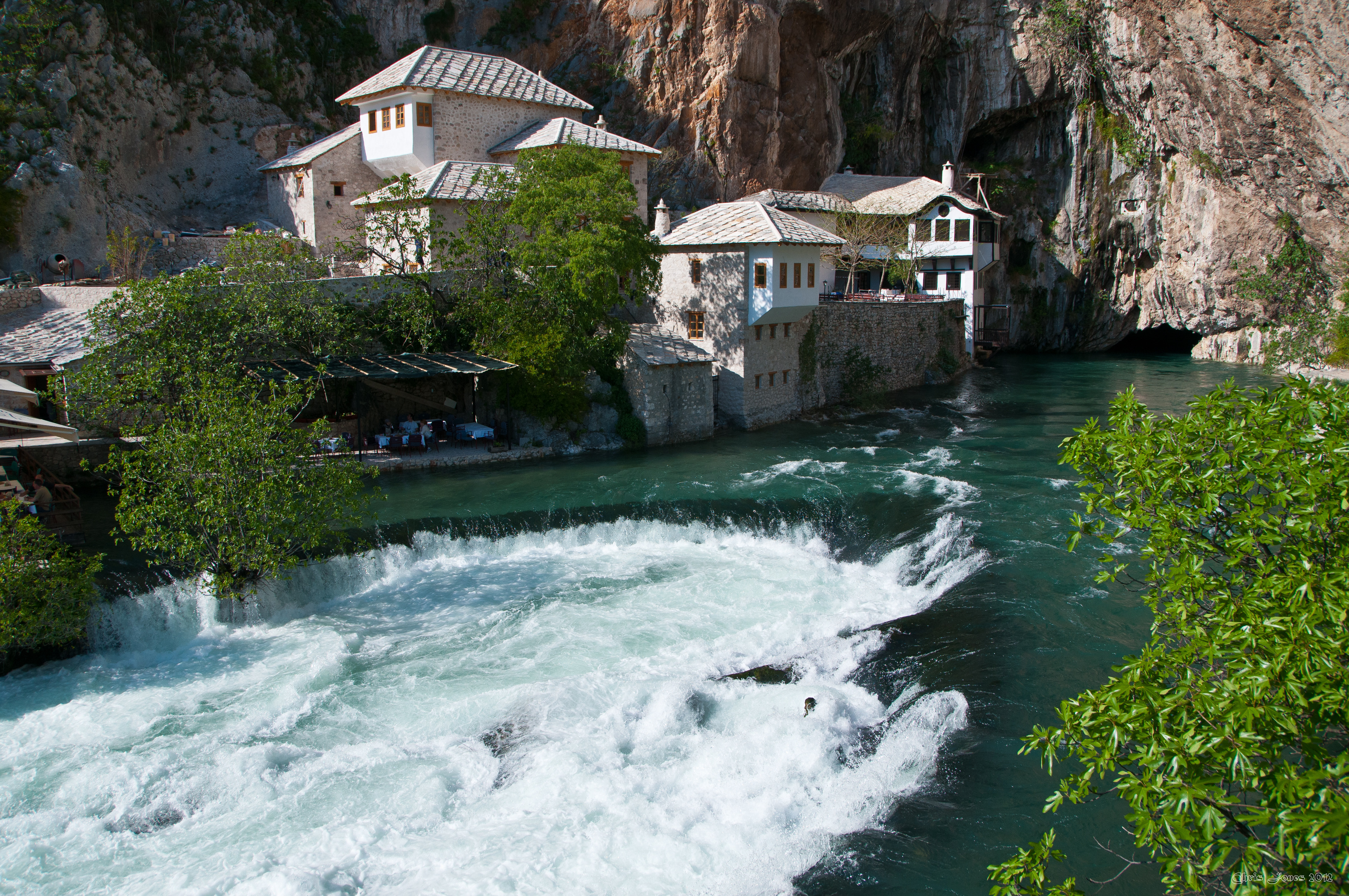
The architectural ensemble of the town of Blagaj

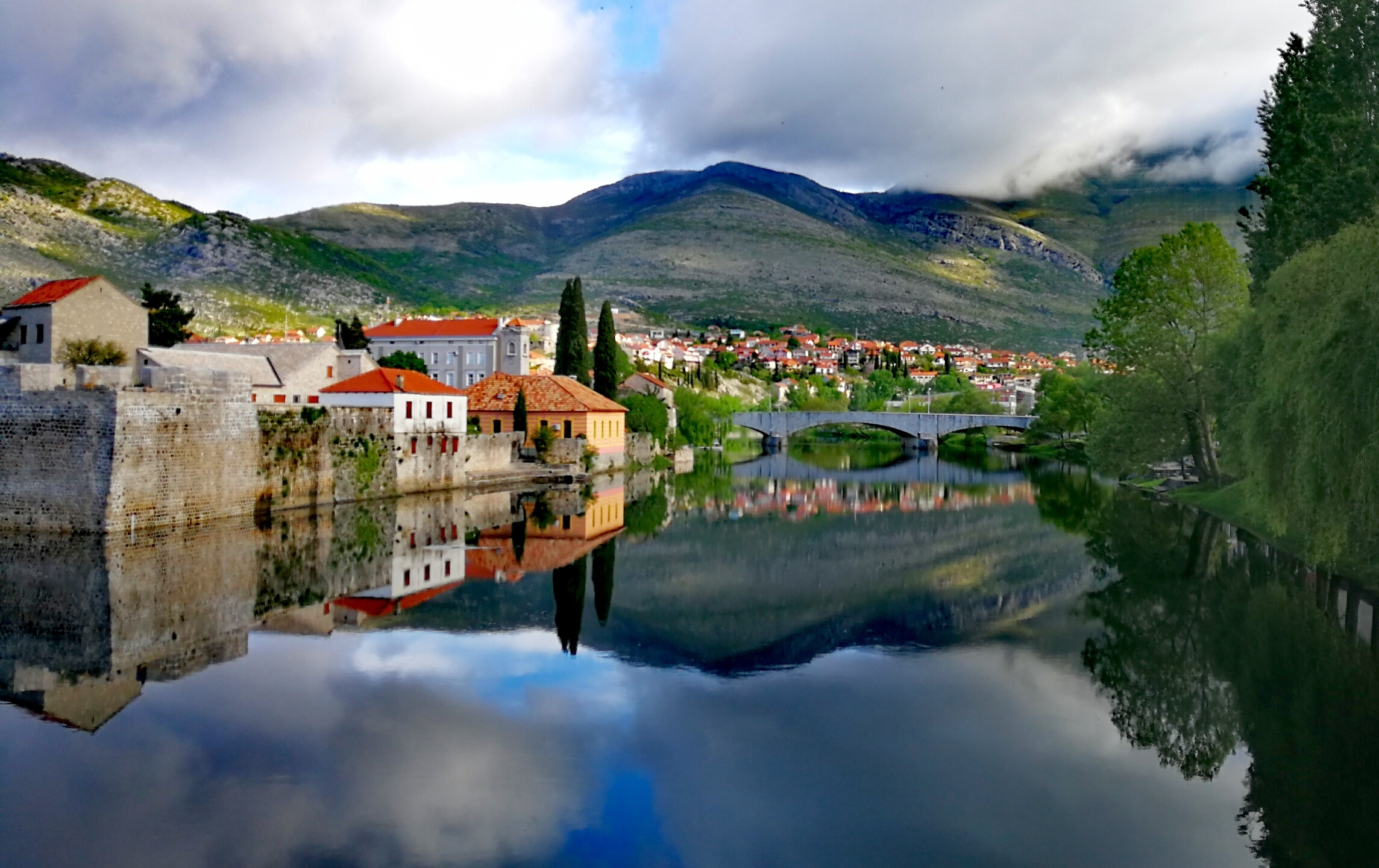
Trebinje on the banks of the Trebišnjica

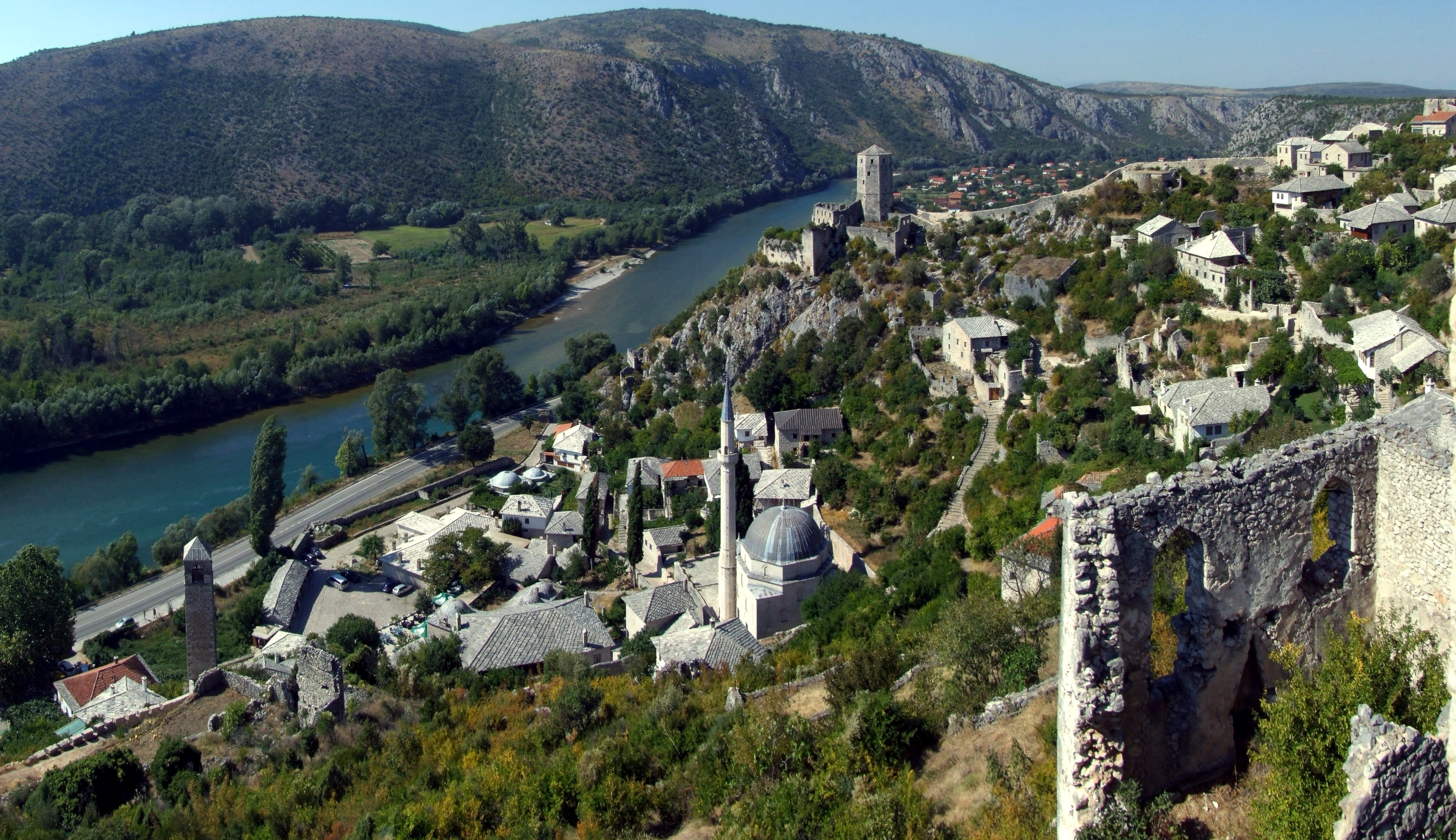
View of the old town of Počitelj

Mostar is an important tourist destination in Bosnia and Herzegovina. Mostar International Airport serves the city as well as the train and bus stations which connect it to a number of national and international destinations. Mostar's old town is an important tourist destination with the Stari Most being its most recognizable feature.

Partisan Memorial Cemetery in Mostar, which is a World War II memorial, is another important city symbol and it was designed by the architect Bogdan Bogdanović. Its sacrosanct quality consists in the unity of nature (water and greenery) with the architectural expression of the designer; the monument was included into a list of national monuments in 2006.

The "Rondo shopping centre", "Biosfera Mall", and the "Mepas Mall" are some of the city's newer attractions. The Catholic pilgrimage site of Međugorje is also nearby as well as the Tekija Dervish Monastery in Blagaj, 13th-century town of Počitelj, Kravica waterfall, seaside town of Neum, Stolac with its famous Stećak necropolis and the remains of an ancient Greek town of Daorson. Nearby sites also include the nature park called Hutovo Blato, Boračko Lake as well as Vjetrenica cave, the largest and most important cave in Bosnia and Herzegovina.

The historic site of Počitelj is located on the left bank of the river Neretva, on the main Mostar to Metković road, and it is to the south of Mostar. During the Middle Ages, Počitelj was considered the administrative centre and centre of governance of Dubrava župa (county), while its westernmost point gave it major strategic importance. It is believed that the fortified town along with its attendant settlements were built by Bosnia's King Stjepan Tvrtko I in 1383. The walled town of Počitelj evolved in the period from the 16th to the 18th centuries. Architecturally, the stone-constructed parts of the town are a fortified complex, in which two stages of evolution are evident: mediaeval, and Ottoman.

Blagaj is situated at the spring of the Buna river and a historical tekke (tekija or Dervish monastery). The Blagaj Tekija was built around 1520, with elements of Ottoman architecture and Mediterranean style and is considered a national monument. The source of the Buna river (Vrelo Bune) is a strong karstic spring. The Buna flows west for approximately 9 kilometres and joins the Neretva near the village Buna. The historic site of the Old Blagaj Fort (Stjepan grad), on the hill above Blagaj, was the seat of Herzegovinian nobleman, Stjepan Vukčić, and the birthplace of Bosnian queen Katarina Kosača-Kotromanić. The architectural ensemble of the Blagaj Tekke (a Sufi monastery) stands by the source of the Buna river, not far from the centre of Blagaj. The musafirhana (guest house) and türbe (mausoleum) are tucked into the natural surroundings, constituting a single entity with the cliffs, source of the Buna river and mills. The musafirhana of the Blagaj tekke and the türbe have been preserved to this day. The musafirhana was built before 1664, and rebuilt in 1851 - its original appearance is not known. The building was subsequently repaired on several occasions. The ensemble of the Blagaj Tekke was presumably built very soon after Ottoman rule was established in Herzegovina, around 1520 at the latest.

Trebinje which was initially a Byzantine territory governed by the Serbs. In the mid 9th century, Knez Vlastimir gave the Župania (city state) of Trebinje (Travunia) to his son-in-law Krajina to govern under his suzerainty. It commanded the road from Ragusa (Dubrovnik) to Constantinople, traversed, in 1096, by Raymond of Toulouse and his crusaders. Under the name of Tribunia or Travunja (the Trebigne of the Ragusans), it belonged to the Serbian Empire until 1355. Trebinje became a part of the expanded Medieval Bosnian state under Tvrtko I in 1373. There is a medieval tower in Gornje Police (Gornye Politse) whose construction is often attributed to Vuk Branković. The old Tvrdoš Monastery dates back to the 15th century. In 1482, together with the rest of Herzegovina and the Bosnian kingdom, it was captured by the Ottoman Empire. The Old Town-Kastel was built by Turks on location of the medieval fortress of Ban Vir, on the western bank of the Trebišnjica River. The city walls, the Old Town square, and two mosques, were built in beginning of the 18th century by Resulbegović family. The Arslanagić bridge was originally built (16th century) at the village of Arslanagić, five kilometres north of the town, by Mehmed-paša Sokolović, and it was managed by Arslanagic family. It was moved closer to Trebinje (1 km) in the late 1960s. The Arslanagić bridge is one of the most attractive Turkish bridges in Bosnia and Herzegovina. It has two large and two small semicircular arches. During the period of Austro-Hungarian administration (1878–1918), several fortifications were built on the surrounding hills, and there was a garrison based in the town. They also modernized the town expanding it westwards, building the present main street, as well as, several squares, park, new schools, tobacco plantations, etc.

Međugorje. Since 1981, it has become a site of religious pilgrimage due to reports of apparitions of the Virgin Mary to six local Catholics.

Following reports of apparitions, successive bishops of Mostar ruled the claims groundless. In March 2010, in view of continued public interest, the Holy See announced that the Congregation for the Doctrine of the Faith was forming an investigative commission, composed of bishops, theologians, and other experts, under the leadership of Cardinal Camillo Ruini, the Pope's former Vicar General for the Diocese of Rome.

=== Bosanska Krajina ===
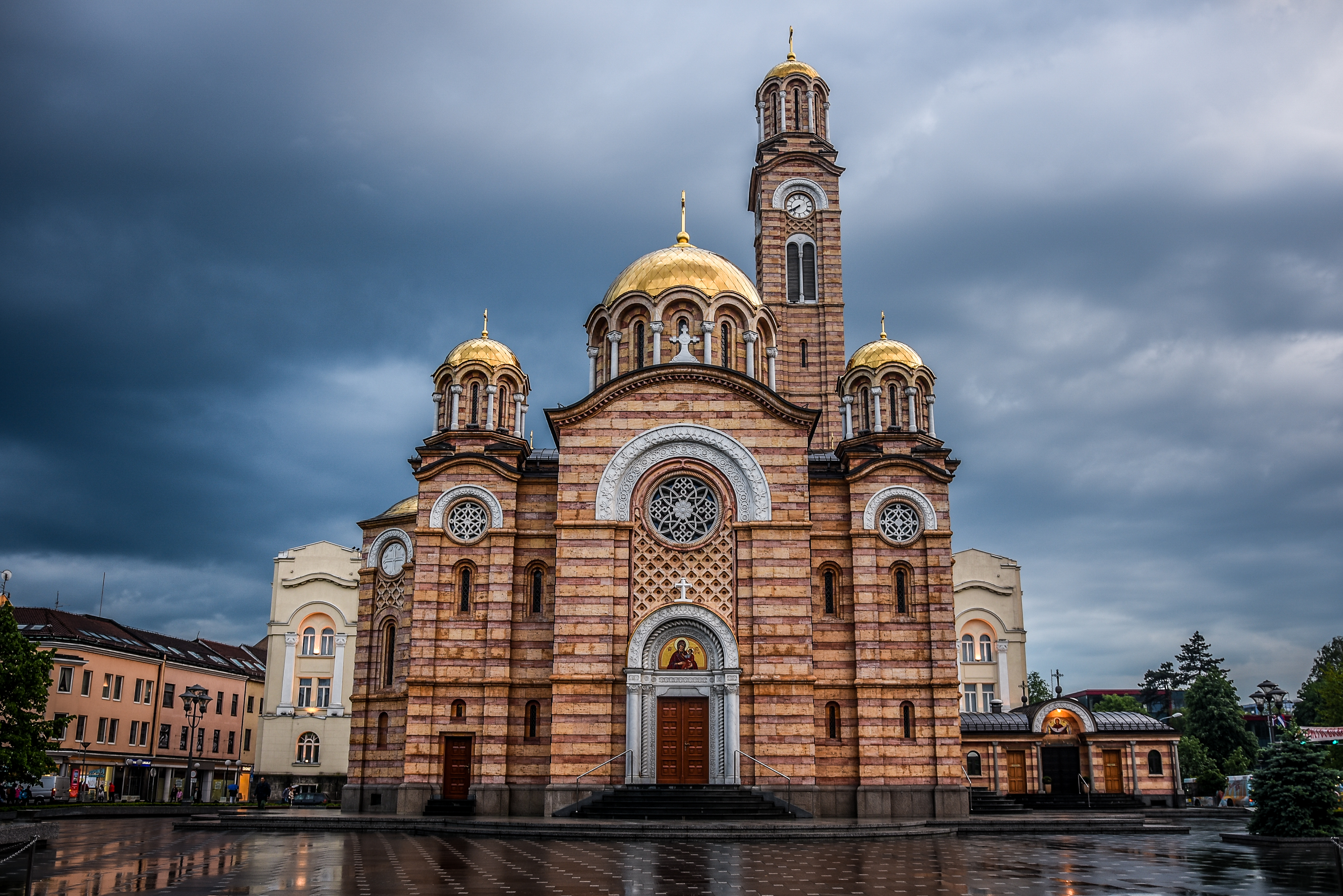
Cathedral of Christ the Saviour

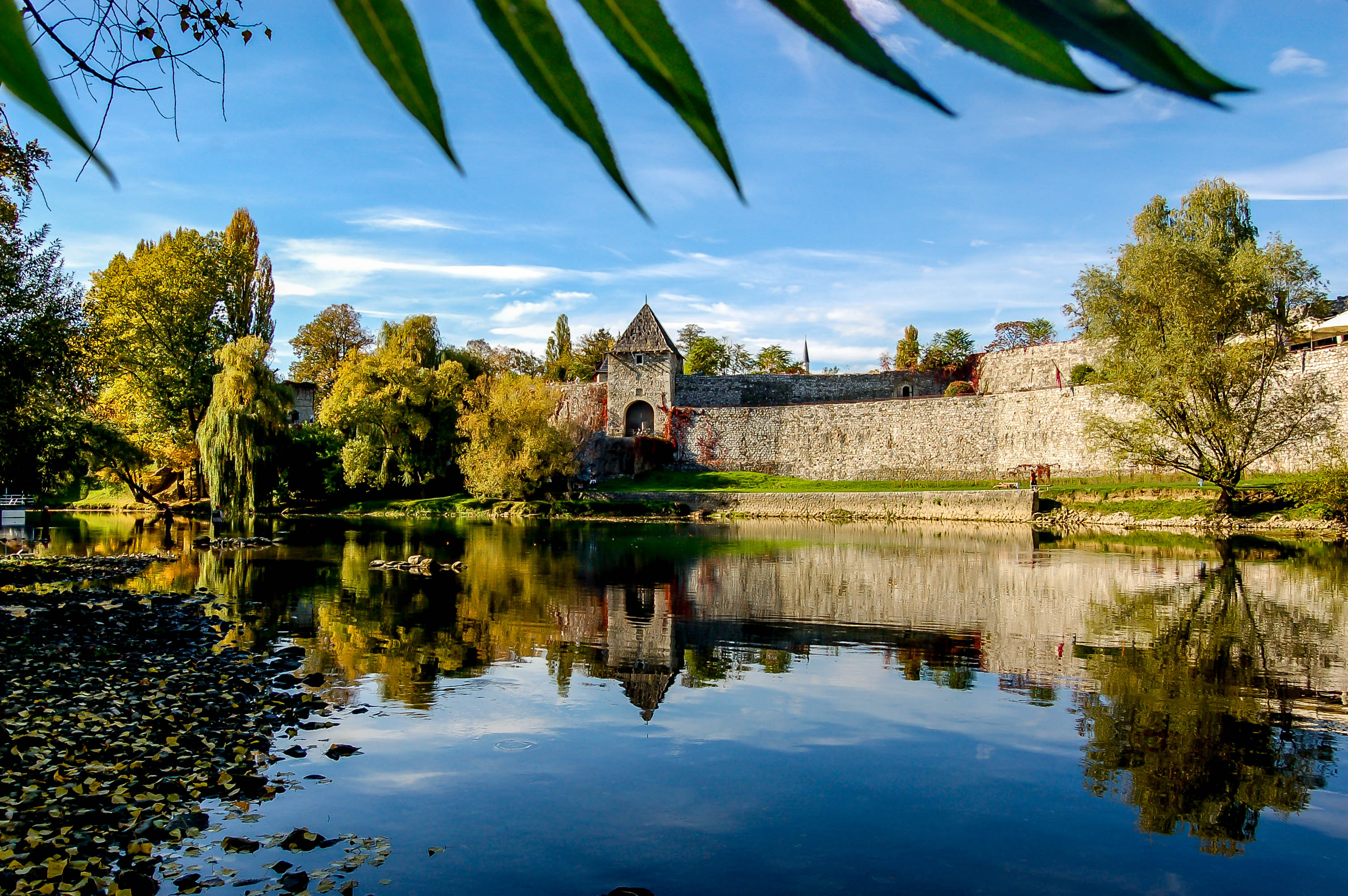
Kastel Fortress on the banks of the Vrbas

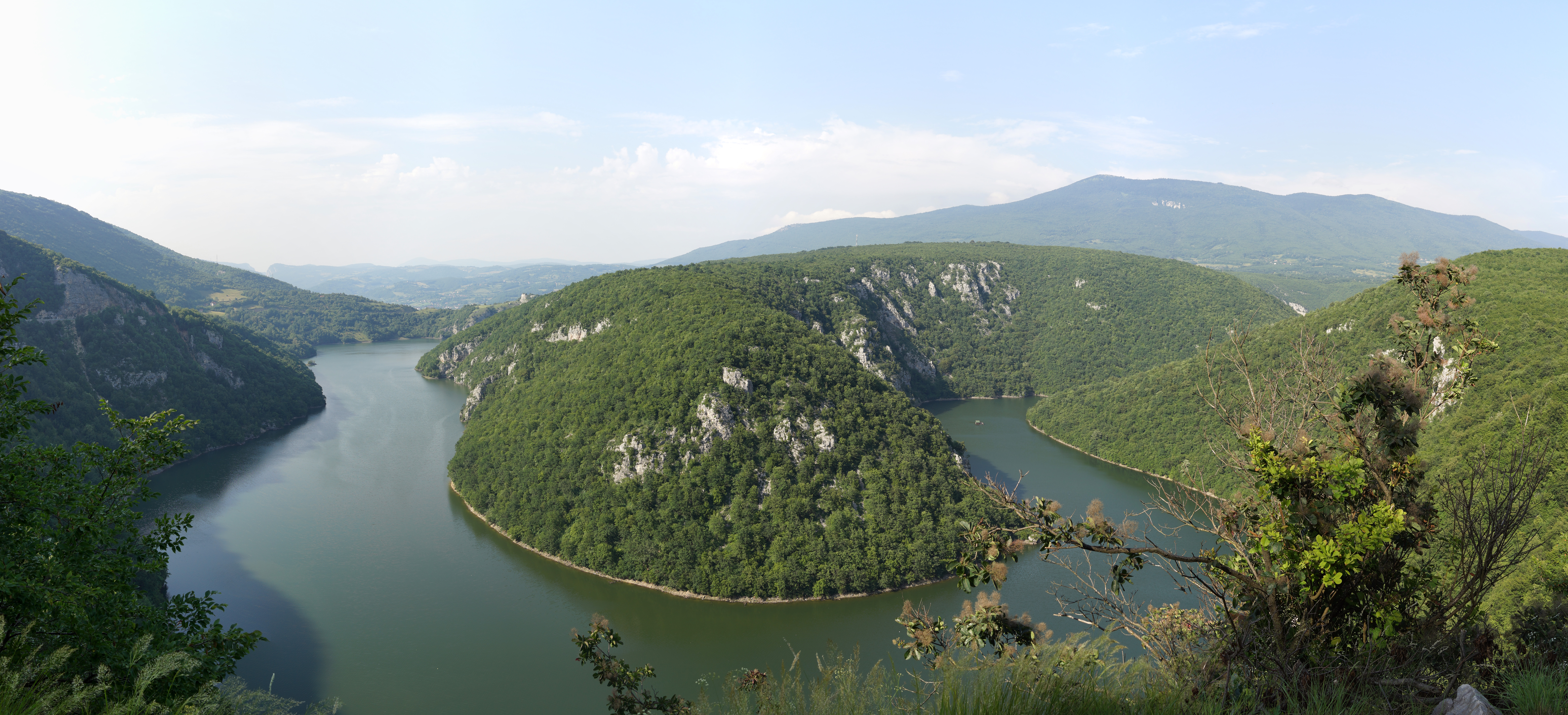
Vrbas Canyon

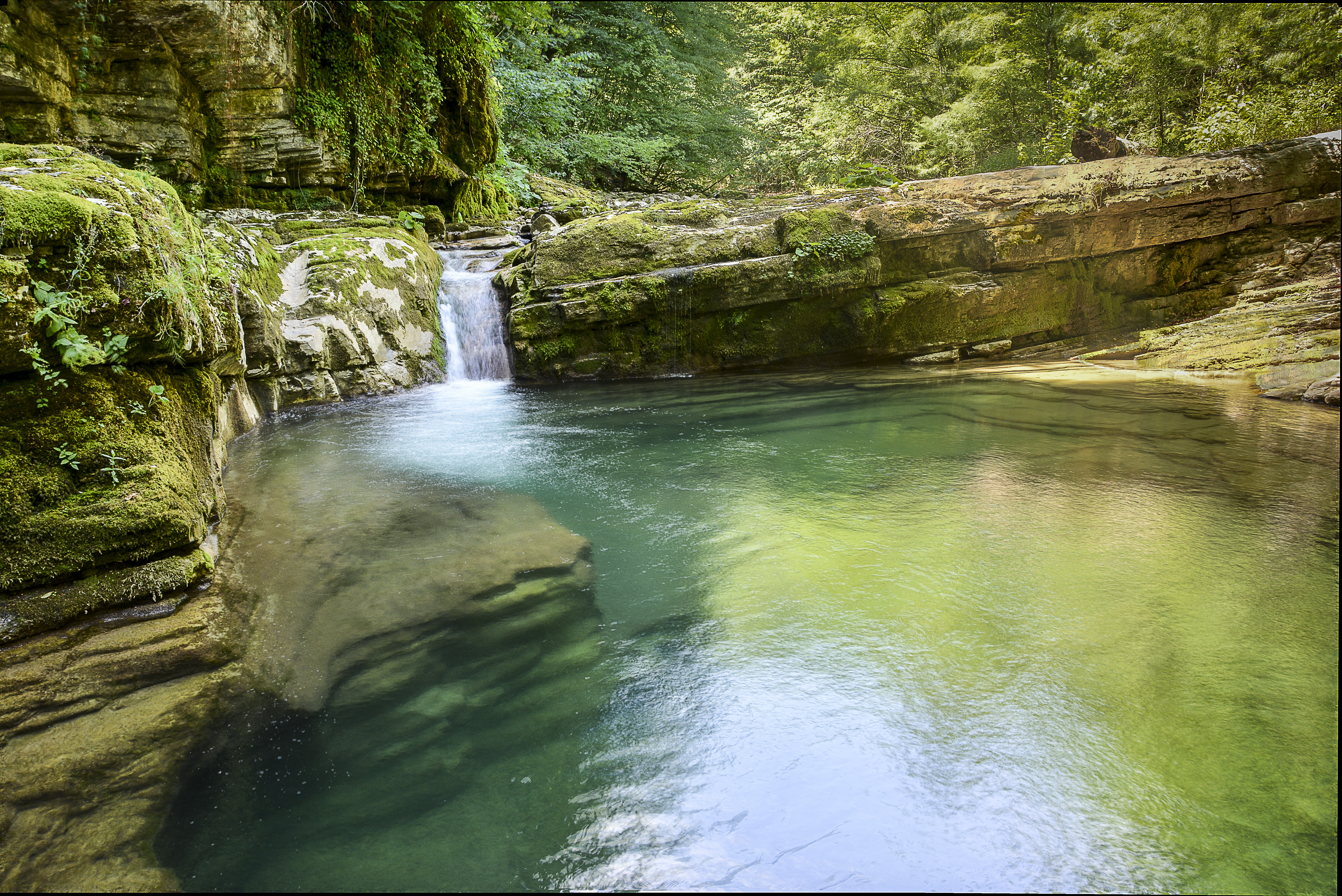
Cvrcka Canyon

The region of Bosanska Krajina is known for its rivers and green landscape. The region also includes cultural cities such as Banja Luka, Prijedor, Bihać and Jajce. Old fortresses and castles such as Ostrožac Castle and Velika Kladusa Castle made by the Ottomans and later Austrian-Hungarians are known national heritage sites. The city of The Bosnian kings, the foundation of Yugoslavia and the Jajce waterfalls Jajce is an UNESCO candidate.

Banja Luka lies on the Vrbas river and is well known in the countries of the Former Yugoslavia for being full of tree-lined avenues, boulevards, gardens, and parks. The city is also home to the old fortress Kastel and the Ferhadija Mosque listed as a Bosnia and Herzegovina cultural heritage site in 1950. It was subsequently protected by UNESCO until its destruction in 1993. Today the site is being rebuilt and is listed as a national monument of Bosnia and Herzegovina. Other attractions of Banja Luka are the Banj Hill and a waterfall of the Vrbas river near Krupa. Rafting on the Vrbas river has become popular among local tourists. There is fishing, rock climbing and hiking along the canyon of the Vrbas between Banja Luka and Jajce, and there is plenty of accommodation for visitors. Near Banja Luka, famous and prominent Trappist monastery, known as Mariastern Abbey, is located. The church and the monastery contains a large number of works of art and valuable cultural and historical legacy.

Prijedor is located on the river Sana and known for its Catholic, Orthodox Christian and Islamic heritage. Historic buildings from the Ottoman and Austrian-Hungarian periods are a feature of the urban landscape. Most known is the old Ottoman houses in the old city and the old city Mosque from the 15th century. The city underwent extensive renovation between 2006 and 2009. Within Prijedor municipality is also Kozara National Park that was proclaimed a protected national forest in 1967 by Josip Broz Tito. It is situated between the rivers Una, Sava, Sana and Vrbas, in BiH. These 33.75 square kilometers of dense forest and hilly meadows have earned the nickname 'Green Beauty of Krajina'. Kozara is a popular hunting ground, with a large 180 square kilometers area of the park open to regulated hunting of deer, pheasants, foxes, boars, hares and ducks. A smaller part of the park is designated for nature lovers. Walking, hiking, biking and herb picking are among the many activities in Kozara.

Jajce was first built in the 14th century and served as the capital of the independent Bosnian kingdom during its time. The town has gates as fortifications, as well as a castle with walls which lead to the various gates around the town. Skenderbeg Mihajlović besieged Jajce in 1501, but without success because he was defeated by Ivaniš Korvin assisted by Zrinski, Frankopan, Karlović and Cubor. When the Bosnian kingdom fell to the Ottoman Empire in 1463, Jajce was taken by the Ottomans but was retaken next year by Hungarian King Matthias Corvinus. About 10–20 kilometres from the Jajce lies the Komotin Castle and town area which is older but smaller than Jajce. It is believed the town of Jajce was previously Komotin but was moved after the black death. During this period, Bosnian queen Katarina Kosača-Kotromanić restored the Church of Saint Luke in Jajce, today the oldest church in town. Eventually, in 1527, Jajce became the last Bosnian town to fall to Ottoman rule. There are several churches and mosques built in different times during different rules, making Jajce a rather diverse town in this aspect. The Franciscan monastery of Saint Luke was completed in 1885. Jajce gained prominence during the Second World War because it hosted the second convention of the Anti-Fascist Council of National Liberation of Yugoslavia on November 29, 1943, a meeting that set the foundation for the Socialist Federal Republic of Yugoslavia after WWII.

Bihać was the temporary capital of the Croatian Kingdom. It lost its civic status in the 14th century following dynastic struggles in the kingdom, and became a property of the Frankopan nobles. In the 16th century it passed under direct royal rule, when battles with the Ottoman Empire had begun. The town of Bihać, in the region of the same name, withstood the Ottoman attacks until it fell with the Bosnia sanjak (in 1592). The Bihać fort would become the westernmost fort taken by the Ottoman army over a hundred years later, in 1592 under the Bosnian vizier Hasan-pasha Predojević. The city was initially made the center of the Bihać sanjak, part of the Bosnian pashaluk. It was demoted in 1699 to become part of the sanjak of Bosnia, during the period of intense border wars between the Habsburg monarchy and the Ottoman Empire. In 1865 it became the center of its own sanjak, but this lasted only until 1878, when all of Bosnia was occupied by Austria-Hungary. The city landscape of Bihac with the Una river has old mosques, catholic churches and splendid nature surroundings.

=== Adriatic Sea ===
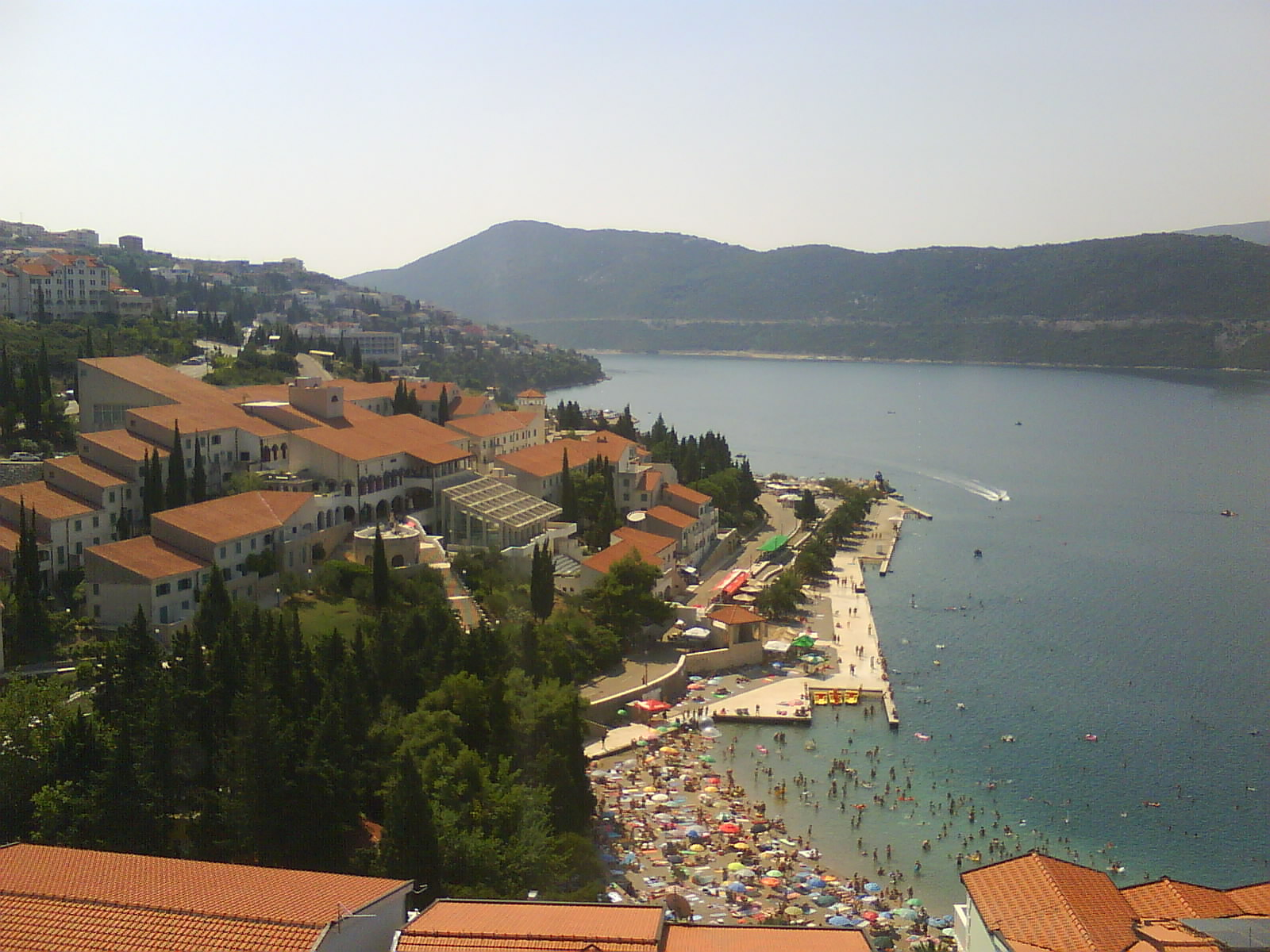
Neum at the Adriatic coast of Bosnia and Herzegovina

Neum is the only coastal town in Bosnia and Herzegovina. It comprises 24.5 km (15 mi) of coastline and is the country's only access to the Adriatic Sea. Neum has steep hills, sandy beaches, and several large tourist hotels. Prices tend to be lower than in neighboring Croatia, making it popular with shoppers. Tourism and the commerce it brings, is the leading contributor to the economy of the area. Border formalities with Croatia are relaxed at peak times. Neum has over 5,000 beds for tourists, 1,810 in hotels with the remaining capacity in villas and private accommodation. Tourism in Neum is mainly active in the coastal region. The inland area behind Neum has a rich archeological history and untouched wilderness and is starting to develop agricultural tourism.

== National parks ==
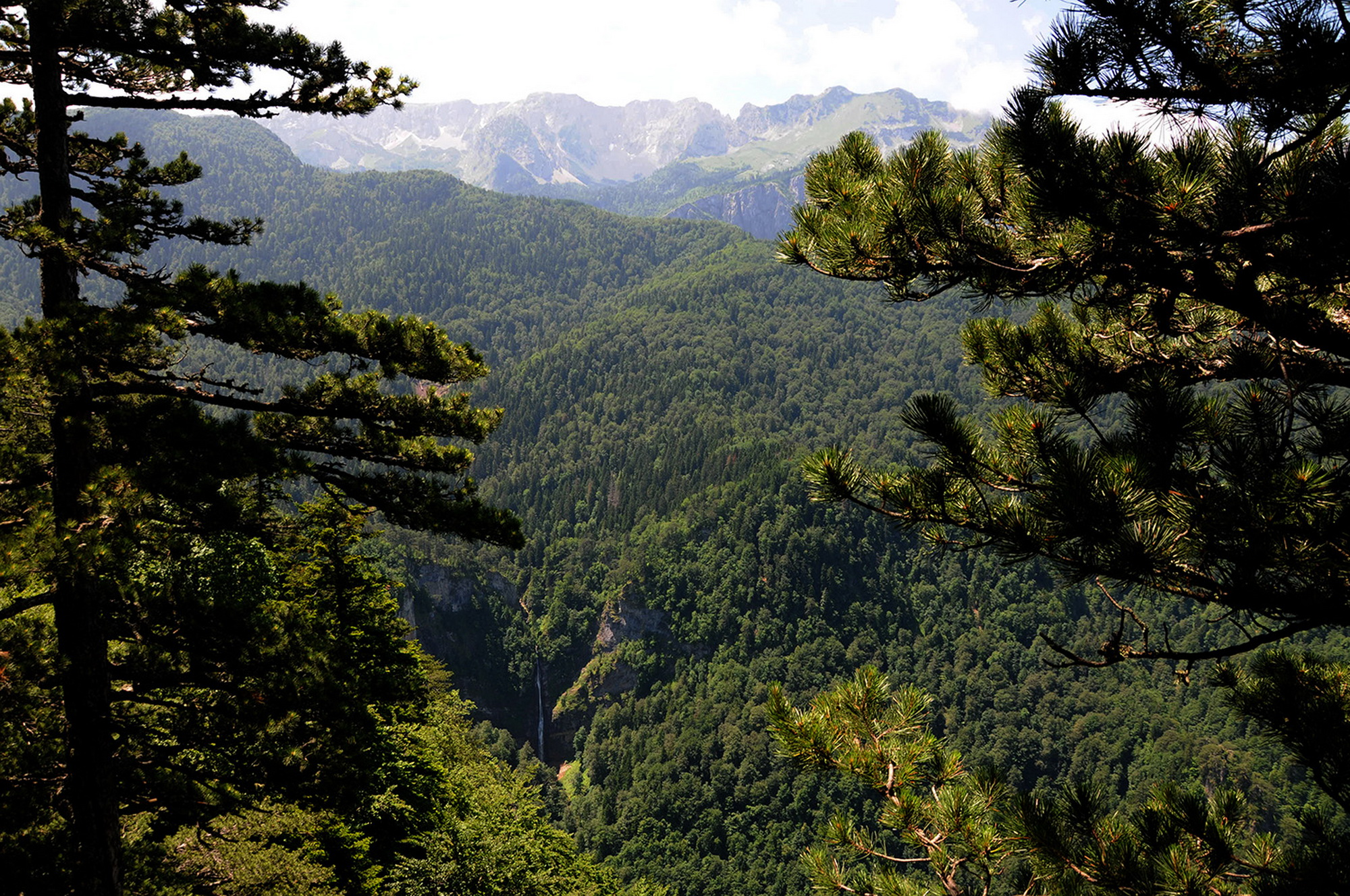
Sutjeska National Park

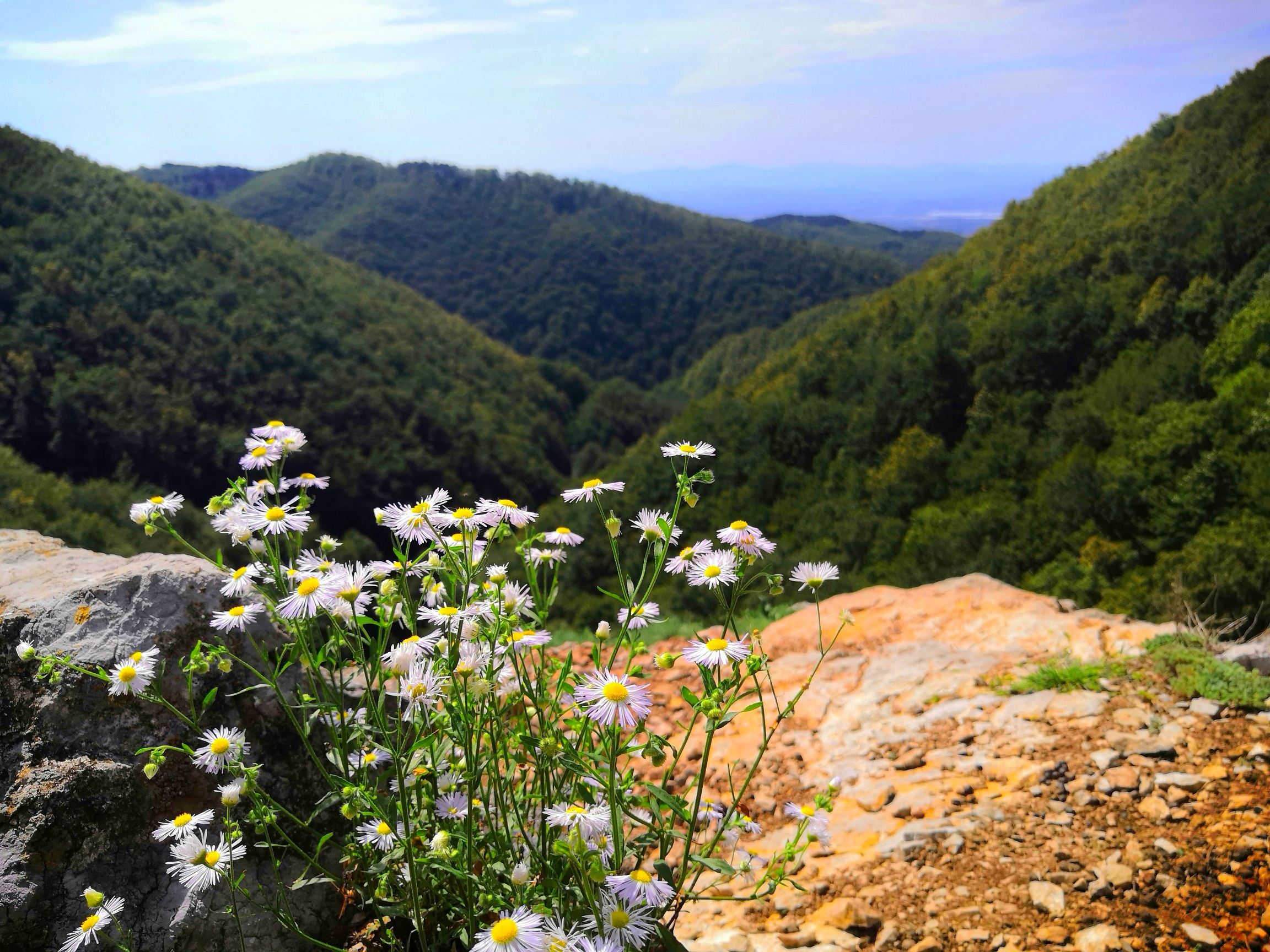
Kozara National Park

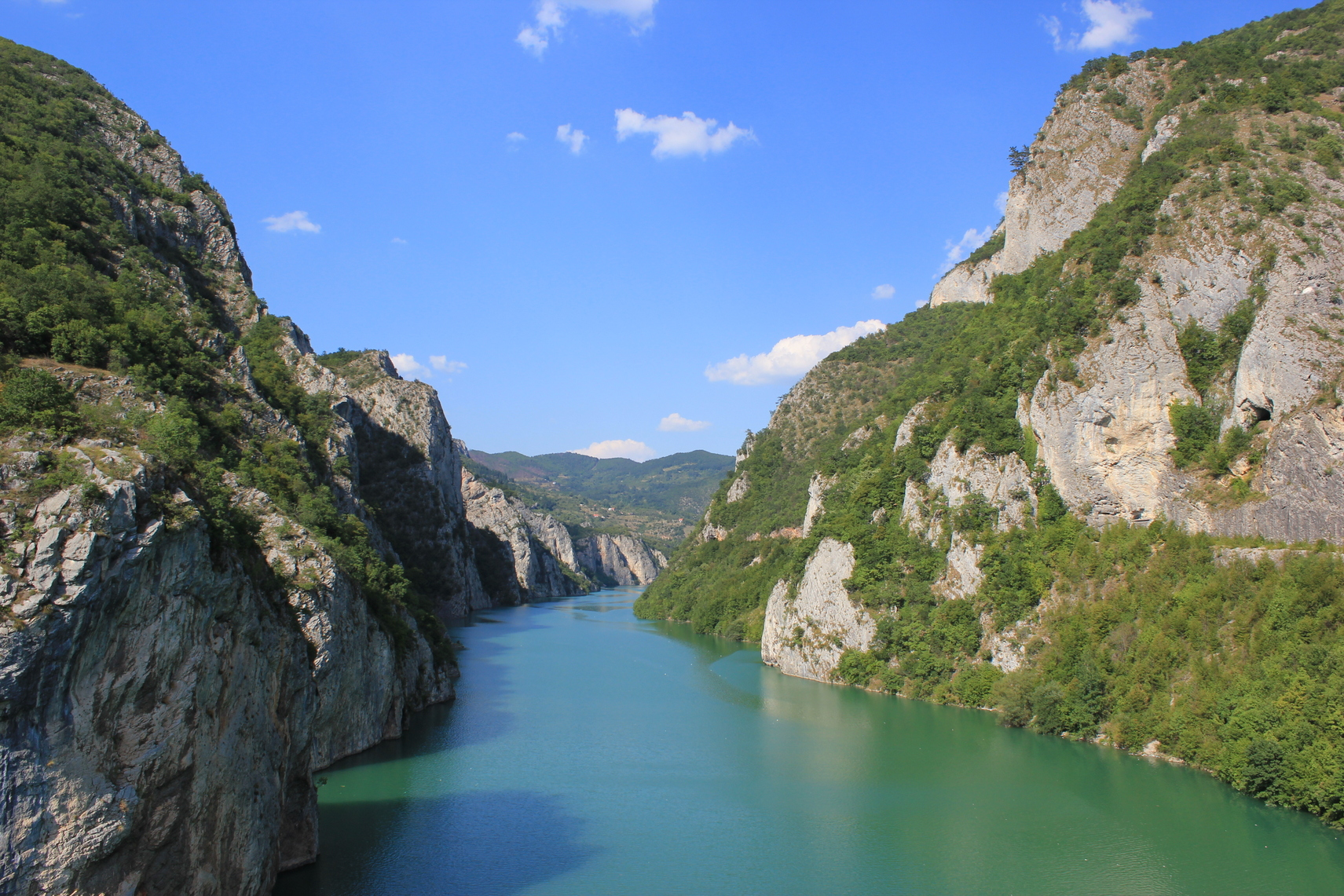
Drina National Park

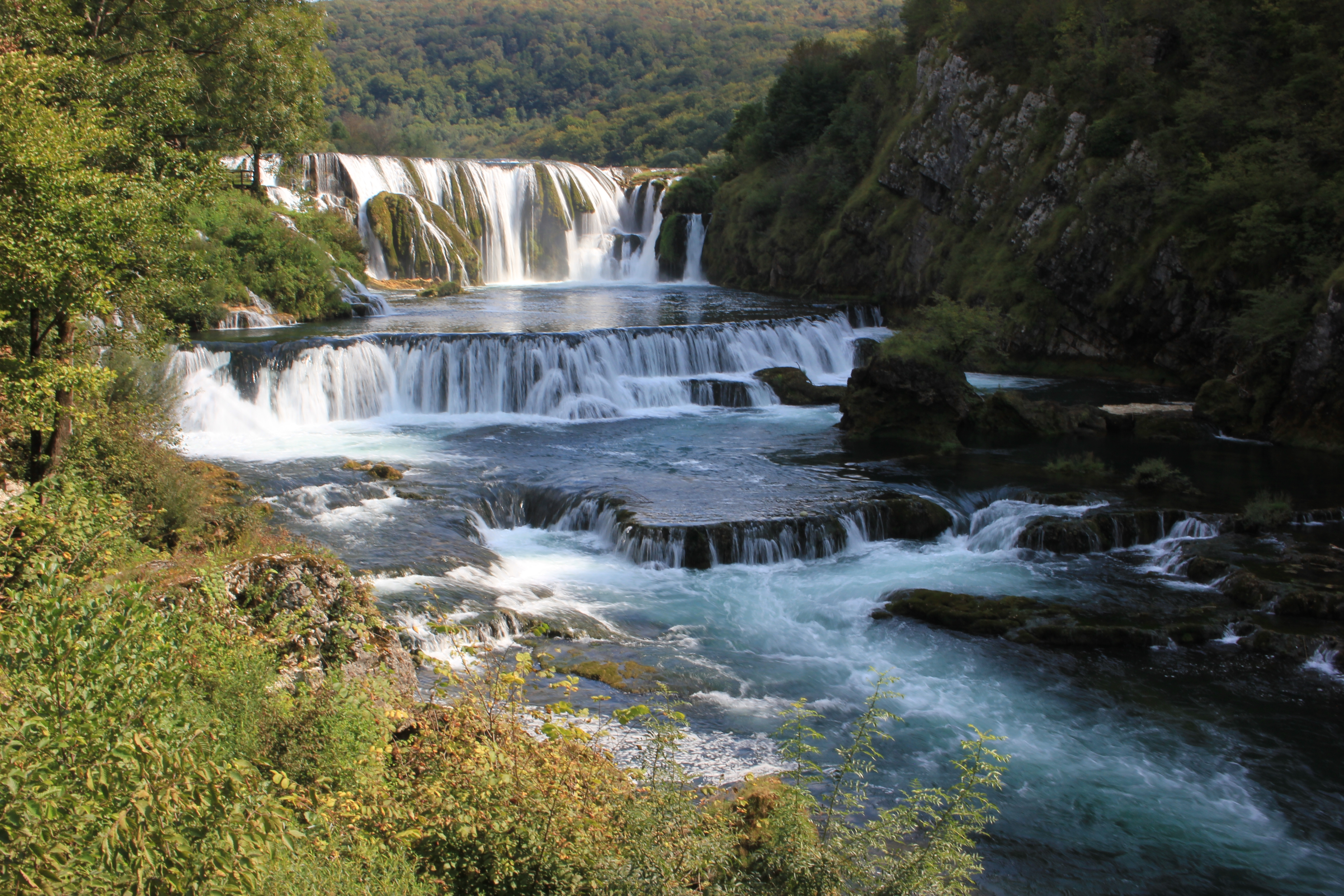
Una National Park

National parks of Bosnia and Herzegovina

Name	Founded in	Area (km^{2})
Sutjeska National Park	1965	173
Kozara National Park	1967	34
Una National Park	2008	198
Drina National Park	2017	

Nature parks of Bosnia and Herzegovina

Name	Founded in	Area (km^{2})
Hutovo Blato	1995	74.11
Blidinje	1995	6

== Statistics ==
Tourist arrivals grew by an average of 24% annually from 1995 to 2000. The European region's solid growth in arrivals in 2007 was due in significant part to Southern and Mediterranean Europe's strong performance (+7%). In particular, Bosnia and Herzegovina were among the stronger players with a growth of 20%. In 2013, the World Economic Forum reported in its Travel and Tourism Competitiveness Report that Bosnia and Herzegovina was the world's eighth friendliest nation towards tourists.

In 2015, Bosnia and Herzegovina surpassed 1 million arrivals and continued the growth in 2016 recording 1.148.530 arrivals (+11,6%) combined with 2.376.743 overnight stay (+10,9%). 67,6% of the tourist arrivals and 69% of the overnight stays came from foreign countries. According to an estimate of the World Tourism Organization, Bosnia and Herzegovina will have the third highest tourism growth rate in the world between 1995 and 2020. The major sending countries in 2016 have been Croatia (11% arrivals, 11,9% nights), Serbia (8,9% arrivals, 8,4% nights), Turkey (10,7% arrivals, 8,0% nights), Slovenia (6,5% arrivals, 6,0% nights) and Italy (5,4% arrivals, 6,5% nights). Furthermore, it is estimated that over 1 million people visit Međugorje every year but the vast majority goes unregistered by the accommodation providers.

In 2017, 1,307,319 tourists visited Bosnia-Herzegovina, an increase of 13.7%, and had 2,677,125 overnight hotel stays, a 12.3% increase from the previous year. Also, 71.5% of the tourists came from foreign countries.

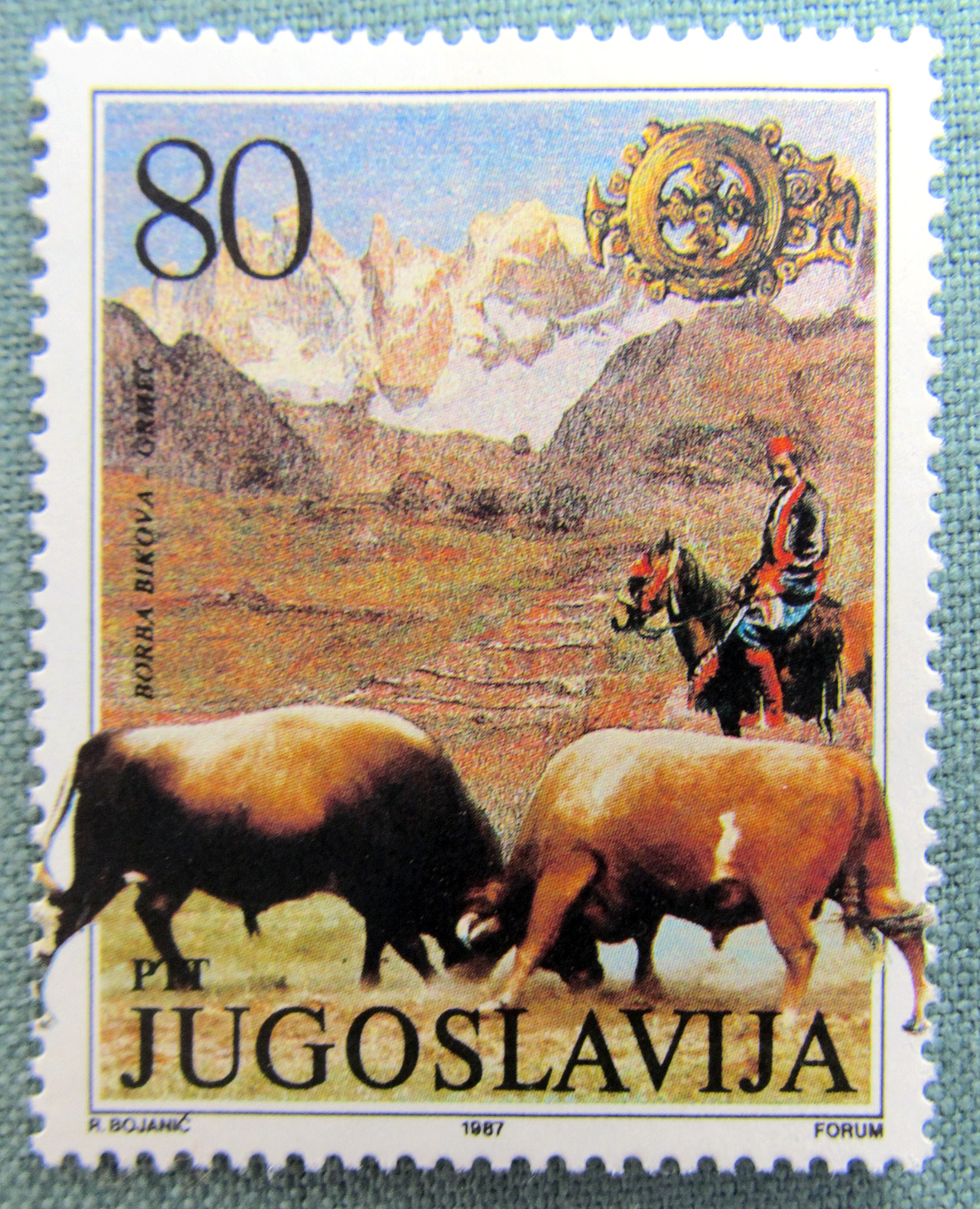
Corrida of Grmeč showed on a Yugoslav era stamp

In 2018, 1.609.310 tourists visited Bosnia-Herzegovina, an increase of 23,1%, and had 3.343.584 overnight hotel stays, a 24.8% increase from the previous year. Also, 71.2% of the tourists came from foreign countries.

In 2019, 1.990.451 tourists visited Bosnia-Herzegovina, an increase of 23,6% and had 4.100.401 overnight hotel stays, a 22.6% increase from the previous year. Also, 74.4% of the tourists came from foreign countries.

In the first 5 months of 2023. 566.244 Tourists visited Bosnia-Herzegovina, an increase of 27% and had 1.202.826 overnight hotel stays, a 24,4% increase from the same period the previous year.

Year	Total number	Increase	Overnight stays	Increase
2026 (1-6)	857.337	-1,1%	1.819.690	1.,0%
2025	1.979.146	2,3%	4.106.383	2,6%
2024	1.935.745	10,4%	4.002.561	9,8%
2023	1.733.071	18,4%	3.645.839	14,2%
2022	1.464.216	52,5%	3.193.944	43,2%
2021	960.383	108,1%	2.230.920	92,1%
2020	461.331	-76,8%	1.161.233	-71,6%
2019	1.641.201	11.8%	3.374.452	9,7%
2018	1.467.807	12.2%	3.046.761	24,8%
2017	1.307.319	13,7%	2.677.125	12,3%
2016	1.148.530	11.6%	2.376.743	10.9%
2015	1.029.000	21.5%	2.143.118	25.2%
2014	846.581	0,3%	1.711.480	-6,1%
2013	844.189	12,9%	1.822.927	10,8%
2012	747.827	9,0%	1.645.521	9,4%
2011	686.148	4,5%	1.504.205	6,2%
2010	656.333	5%	1.416.691	11,7%

Number of tourists in Sarajevo

Year	Total number	Increase	Overnight stays	Increase
2024	806.597	12.4%	1.545.491	7.7%
2023	716.293	26.7%	1.432.133	20.8%
2022	565.139	67.1%	1.185.115	48.5%
2021	338.083	148.2%	797.639	190.3%
2020	136.187	-82.3%	274.731	-80.5%
2019	771.910	28%	1.415.671	19.3%
2018	602.613	26.3%	1.102.458	19.1%
2017	476.873	17,1%	925,545	12,6%
2016	407.339	11,8%	821.357	18,5%
2015	363.818	17,8%	691.990	15,4%
2014	308.907	2,1%	599.533	0,7%
2013	302.570	17,9%	595.637	18%
2012	256.628	10,8%	504.929	12,9%
2011	231.537	10,5%	447,267	13,7%
2010	209.525	13,9%	393.494	12,4%

List of Top 15 countries most visitors come from:

Rank	Country	2025	2024	2023	2022	2021	2020	2019	2018	2017
1	Turkey	▼193,714	▲205,831	▲142,710	▲62,934	▲22,410	▼7,833	▼70,988	▼85,416	90,749
2	Croatia	▲180,485	▲174,405	▲167,609	▲129,753	▲57,881	▼44,204	▲138,293	▲116,823	96,965
3	Serbia	▼149,230	▲156,744	▲149,363	▲142,237	▲91,081	▼54,870	▲102,316	▲88,797	77,867
4	China	▲90,832	▲74,996	▲30,615	▲5,234	▼1,946	▼4,910	▲102,758	▲58,235	31,780
5	Slovenia	▲78,033	▼77,961	▲78,117	▲62,407	▲23,437	▼9,677	▲138,293	▲67,930	▲65,002
6	Saudi Arabia	▼68,081	▲91,994	▲53,192	▼33,598	▲36,220	▼1,970	▲65,853	▲30,930	24,402
7	Germany	▲58,970	▼51,350	▲55,862	▲47,531	▲26,027	▼6,080	▲56,782	▲50,402	34,612
8	United States	▲42,872	▲40,548	▲36,592	▲29,532	▲14,007	▼4,505	▲33,960	▲28,187	25,926
9	Austria	▲39,225	▲36,928	▲35,971	▲29,410	▲16,856	▼4,426	▲28,114	▲26,560	23,889
10	Italy	▲38,351	▲35,070	▲28,587	▲22,370	▲9,131	▼3,567	▲47,841	▲44,979	43,718
11	Montenegro	▲35,604	▲30,754	▲30,232	▲25,231	▲15,220	▼6,552	▲18,532	▲16,923	14,190
12	Poland	▼32,622	▲33,289	▲24,372	▲22,625	▲7,986	▼1,097	▲37,520	▼37,497	▼39,551
13	United Kingdom	▲25,928	▲21,662	▲14,101	▲11,465	▲4,531	▼1,714	▲15,082	▲14,202	12,715
14	France	▲21,993	▲19,523	▲19,166	▲16,115	▲8,547	▼1,610	▼20,234	▲20,282	15,851
15	Netherlands	▲20,921	▲20,117	▲18,938	▲17,355	▼70	▼2,034	▲17,000	▲17,000	▲15,740
	Total tourists	1,962,982	1,935,745	1,755,040	1,477,371	971,302	500,916	1,641,201	1,467,807	1,307,550

== See also ==
- Visa policy of Bosnia and Herzegovina
