= Trebižat =

- Village
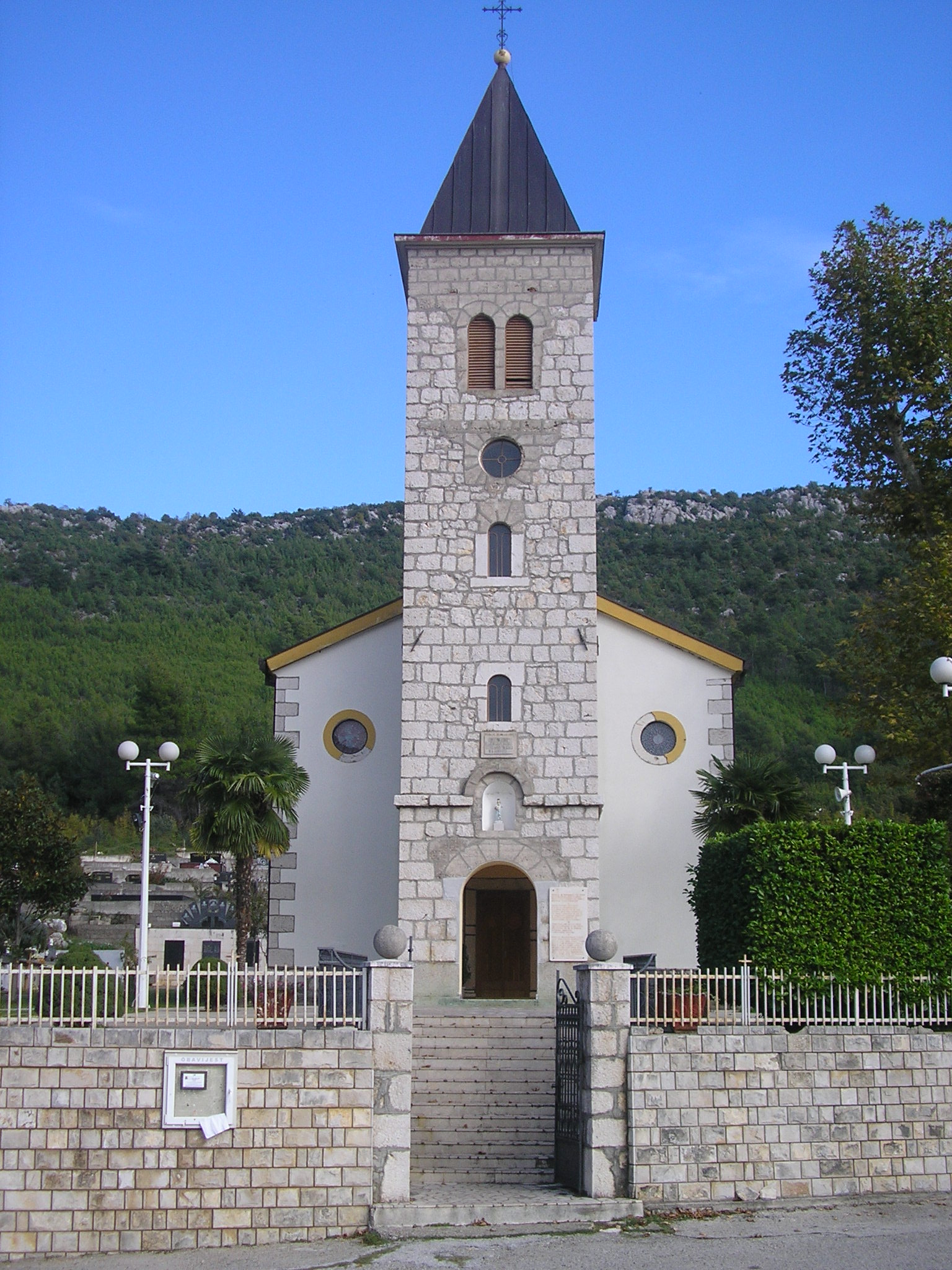
- Marys Assumption church in Trebižat

- Location within Bosnia and Herzegovina
- Coordinates: 43°08′N 17°41′E
- Country: Bosnia and Herzegovina
- Entity: Federation of Bosnia and Herzegovina
- Canton: Herzegovina-Neretva
- Municipality: Čapljina

Area
  - Total: 3.93 sq mi (10.17 km^{2})

Population (2013)
  - Total: 1,272
  - Density: 323.9/sq mi (125.1/km^{2})
- Time zone: UTC+1 (CET)
  - Summer (DST): UTC+2 (CEST)

Trebižat is a village in Bosnia and Herzegovina. According to the 1991 census, the village is located in the municipality of Čapljina.

== Demographics ==
According to the 2013 census, its population was 1,272.

Gender (C 2013)
Males	638
Females	634

Ethnicity in 2013
Ethnicity	Number	Percentage
Croats	1,271	99.9%
other/undeclared	1	0.1%
Total	1,272	100%
