= Ars Aevi =

- Established: 11 July 1992
- Location: Sarajevo, Bosnia and Herzegovina
- Coordinates: 43°51′32″N 18°26′0″E
- Type: Art Museum
- Collection size: 1,600

Ars Aevi is a museum of contemporary art in Sarajevo, Bosnia and Herzegovina. It was established during the siege of Sarajevo as a cultural resistance movement to the Bosnian war. It holds a collection of approximately 130 works by renowned world artists such as Michelangelo Pistoletto, Jannis Kounellis, Joseph Beuys, Marina Abramović and Joseph Kosuth. A new museum building, designed by Renzo Piano, is planned to be built in the upcoming years.
