= Baščaršija Nights =

Annual culture festival in Sarajevo

Baščaršija Nights Baščaršijske noći (Bosnian)
- Performance at Baščaršija Nights
- Status: Active
- Genre: Cultural festival
- Date: Annually in July
- Frequency: Annual
- Locations: Sarajevo, Bosnia and Herzegovina
- Years active: 1996–present
- Attendance: ~150,000 annually
- Website: bascarsijskenoci.bkc.ba

Baščaršija Nights (Bosnian: Baščaršijske noći; Serbo-Croatian Cyrillic: Башчаршијске ноћи) is an annual cultural festival held every July in Sarajevo, the capital of Bosnia and Herzegovina.
