= Sarajevo Winter Festival =

Cultural festival in Sarajevo, Bosnia

Coordinates: 43°52′N 18°25′E

The Sarajevo Winter Festival (Bosnian, Croatian and Serbian: Sarajevska zima / Сарајевска зима) is a cultural festival held annually since the winter of 1984-1985.

The “Sarajevo Winter” Festival has traditionally been held under the auspices of the Secretary General of the Council of Europe, European Union, UNESCO, The Presidency of B&H, The Federation of B&H, The Council of Ministers of B&H, Sarajevo Canton, City of Sarajevo and Stari grad Municipality.
