= Kozarde =

Kozarde Козарде
- Village
- Location within Bosnia and Herzegovina
- Coordinates: 43°50′59″N 18°56′10″E
- Country: Bosnia and Herzegovina
- Entity: Republika Srpska
- Municipality: Rogatica

Population (2013)
  - Total: 18
- Time zone: UTC+1 (CET)
  - Summer (DST): UTC+2 (CEST)

Kozarde (Serbian Cyrillic: Козарде) is a village in the Republika Srpska, Bosnia and Herzegovina. According to the 2013 census, the village is located in the municipality of Rogatica and had a population of 18.
