= Godomilje =

Coordinates: 43°55′13″N 19°05′28″E

Godomilje Годомиље
- Village
- Interactive map of Godomilje
- Country: Bosnia and Herzegovina
- Entity: Republika Srpska
- Municipality: Rogatica
- Time zone: UTC+1 (CET)
  - Summer (DST): UTC+2 (CEST)

Godomilje (Serbian Cyrillic: Годомиље) is a village in the Bosnia and Herzegovina. According to the 1991 census, the village is located in the municipality of Rogatica.
