= Grivci =

Grivci Гривци
- Village
- Location within Bosnia and Herzegovina
- Coordinates: 43°51′16″N 18°52′32″E
- Country: Bosnia and Herzegovina
- Entity: Republika Srpska
- Municipality: Rogatica
- Time zone: UTC+1 (CET)
  - Summer (DST): UTC+2 (CEST)

Grivci (Serbian Cyrillic: Гривци) is a village in the Republika Srpska, Bosnia and Herzegovina. According to the 1991 census, the village is located in the municipality of Rogatica.
