= Jarovići =

Jarovići may refer to:

- Jarovići (Goražde), a village in Bosnia and Herzegovina
- Jarovići (Rogatica), a village in Bosnia and Herzegovina
