= Božine =

Božine Божине
- Village
- Location within Bosnia and Herzegovina
- Coordinates: 43°49′49″N 18°52′56″E
- Country: Bosnia and Herzegovina
- Entity: Republika Srpska
- Municipality: Rogatica

Government
- Time zone: UTC+1 (CET)
  - Summer (DST): UTC+2 (CEST)

Božine (Serbian Cyrillic: Божине) is a village in the Republika Srpska, Bosnia and Herzegovina. According to the 1991 census, the village is located in the municipality of Rogatica.
