= Dobrouščići =

Dobrouščići Доброучићи
- Village
- Location within Bosnia and Herzegovina
- Coordinates: 43°48′59″N 19°04′26″E
- Country: Bosnia and Herzegovina
- Entity: Republika Srpska
- Municipality: Rogatica
- Time zone: UTC+1 (CET)
  - Summer (DST): UTC+2 (CEST)

Dobrouščići (Serbian Cyrillic: Доброучићи) is a village in the Republika Srpska, Bosnia and Herzegovina. According to the 1991 census, the village is located in the municipality of Rogatica.
