= Beheći =

Beheći Бехећи
- Village
- Location within Bosnia and Herzegovina
- Coordinates: 43°54′53″N 19°01′20″E
- Country: Bosnia and Herzegovina
- Entity: Republika Srpska
- Municipality: Rogatica
- Time zone: UTC+1 (CET)
  - Summer (DST): UTC+2 (CEST)

Beheći (Serbian Cyrillic: Бехећи) is a village in the Republika Srpska, Bosnia and Herzegovina. According to the 1991 census, the village is located in the municipality of Rogatica.
