= Borak necropolis =

Medieval stećak necropolis in Bosnia and Herzegovina

Stećak necropolis Borak
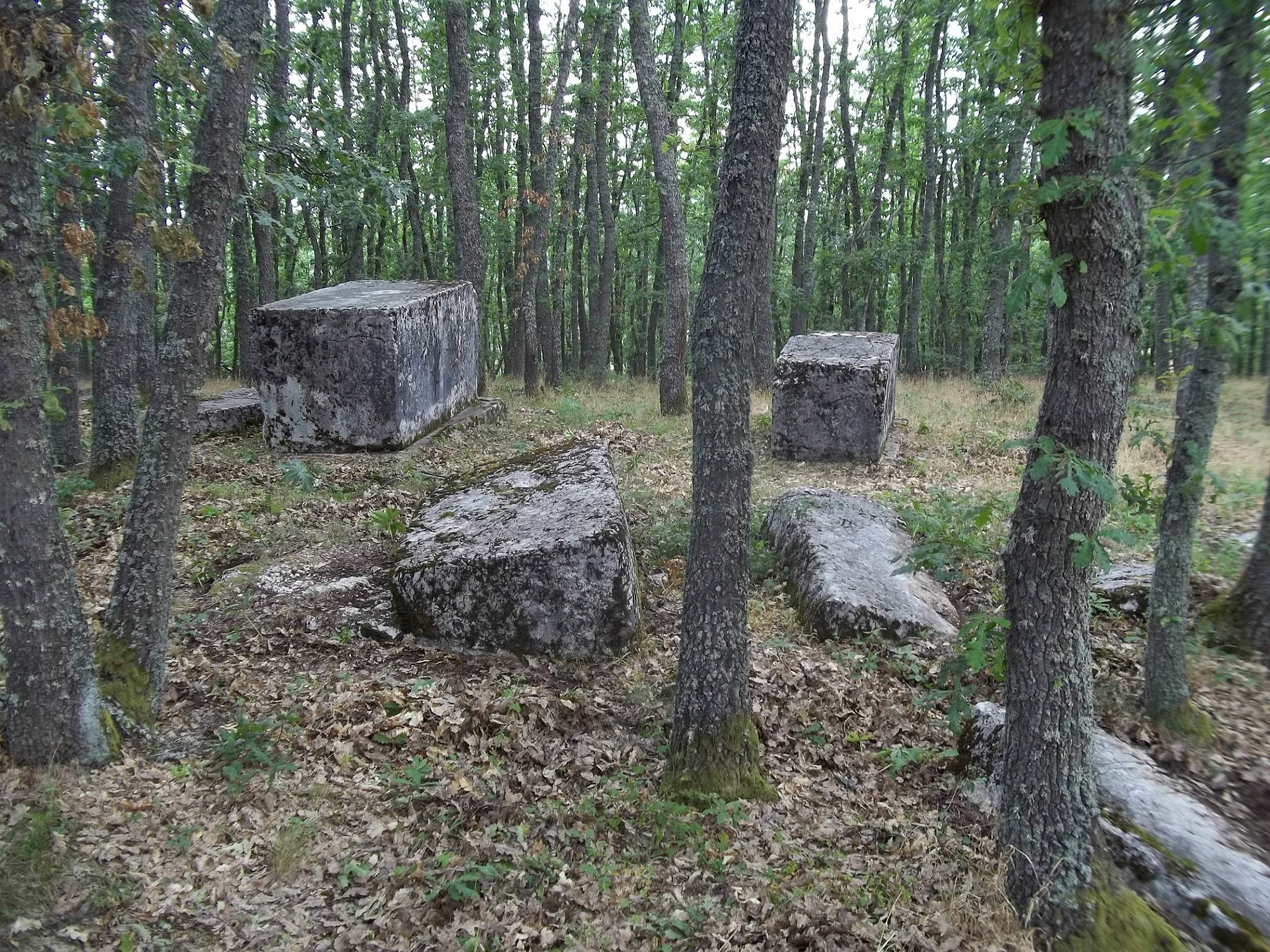
- Necropolis with stećci Borak (Han-Stjenički plateau), Burati
- Interactive map of Stećak necropolis Borak

Details
- Established: 14-15th century
- Location: Burati, Rogatica
- Country: Bosnia and Herzegovina
- Type: Medieval stećak necropolis
- Owned by: State
- No. of graves: 212

KONS of Bosnia and Herzegovina
- Official name: Borak (Han-stjenički plateau) necropolis with stećak tombstones in the village of Burati, the historic site
- Type: Category 0 cultural property
- Designated: November 5, 2008 (-th KONS session; decision No. 05.1-02-247/07-8)
- Reference no.: 3054
- List of National Monuments of Bosnia and Herzegovina

UNESCO World Heritage Site
- Official name: Historic site, stećaks' necropolis Borak, Rogatica
- Type: Cultural
- Reference no.: 1504-004
- Region: Europe

The Borak necropolis with stećaks is located in Bosnia and Herzegovina on the hill of Borak, next to the village of Burati, at an altitude of 140m. To the right of the main road Sokolac-Rogatica. The national monument is located in the location that includes Kramer village, Rogatica municipality. 212 visible stećaks were recorded at the necropolis, of which the greater number are oriented in the east–west direction, and the smaller number are in the north–south direction.

== History ==
There is not enough data to shed light on the political and social conditions of this region during the Middle Ages. Based on the remains of material cultural assets, it can be concluded that there was a settlement in Rogatica in the Middle Ages. Two significant facts point to this, namely the route of the old Dubrovnik medieval road from Dubrovnik to Srebrenica, which went through Rogatica, and the remains of the fortifications that still exist today near the town itself. In the document of the Dubrovnik archive, there is information that in the 14th and 15th centuries Rogatica was the center of a rich livestock region, which supplied Dubrovnik with cattle. At that time, Rogatica was connected to the Borač fortress, and to its lords Radinović-Pavlović noble family.

The first and older fortress was on the opposite side of Mesići, between the present-day villages of Borač and Bričigovo, where the remains of the fortress can still be seen today.

In the period from 1417 to 1436, Borač became a very important destination for caravans. It is said to have attracted merchants, not only as the capital of Pavlović but also as a convenient staging point for northeastern Bosnia. The Dubrovnik road split off near Goražde and went down to Borač, and from there it continued to Srebrenica and Zvornik. Traders who went from the Lim Valley to the region of Vrhbosna also passed through Borač.

When Srebrenica came under the control of the Serbian state in 1411, Borač became a border town. The Dubrovnik government orders its merchants to unload all goods destined for Srebrenica and Zvornik in Borač, on the border of the Serbian state, and to wait there for the disputes arising over the border to settle.

== Stećaks ==
With the appearance of the first mines and cities in medieval Bosnia, all the prerequisites for the appearance of stećak in these areas were fulfilled. Stećaks were new form of marking graves with a tombstones, which in Europe started somewhat earlier in XII and XIII centuries. However, medieval tombstones are characteristic of the area of the medieval Bosnian state, where stećaks appear as part of an unbroken sepulchral continuity in the Bosnian area whose roots go into prehistoric times. The Stećci are spread all over Bosnia and Herzegovina (except Posavina and the western part of Bosnian Krajina). The names that people used for stećaks, often in parallel, are bilig, käm, zlamen, kuća, stari greb, divovsko kamenje, and for necropolises kaursko greblje, all of which can be found in the inscriptions on the stećaks themselves.

== Research and conservation-restoration works ==
In the 1950s, the Directorate of the National Museum in Sarajevo began researching the necropolises and stećaks. At the Borak site, it was determined that there are about 150 stećaks, of which 110 chests and about 40 gables. They also state that the stećci were well cut, but that only three were decorated. Of these, one chest and two gables. The motifs on them are a crescent moon, a rosette, a hand with a sword and representations of a dog, a deer, a man and a bear.

=== The current state of the Borak necropolis ===
On the last inspection, carried out in 2008, a total of 214 visible stećaks were counted, and it was concluded that the number could be higher. The various types of moss and lichen are present on most of the stećaks, which harm the stone structure. The stećak necropolis is located in young oak forest and which also covered it with fallen leaves. Most of the stećaks were partially or completely sunken and heavily overgrown with moss, while underneath of many stones a dug holes made by various animals were noticed, which also endangering their structure and integrity. The most stećaks are oriented in the east–west direction, while few deviates in the north–south direction.

== Protection ==
Since November 2008, the historical area of the Borak necropolis with the stećaks has been declared a National Monuments of Bosnia and Herzegovina by the KONS.

== Gallery ==
Borak necropolis, part of UNESCO World Heritage Site

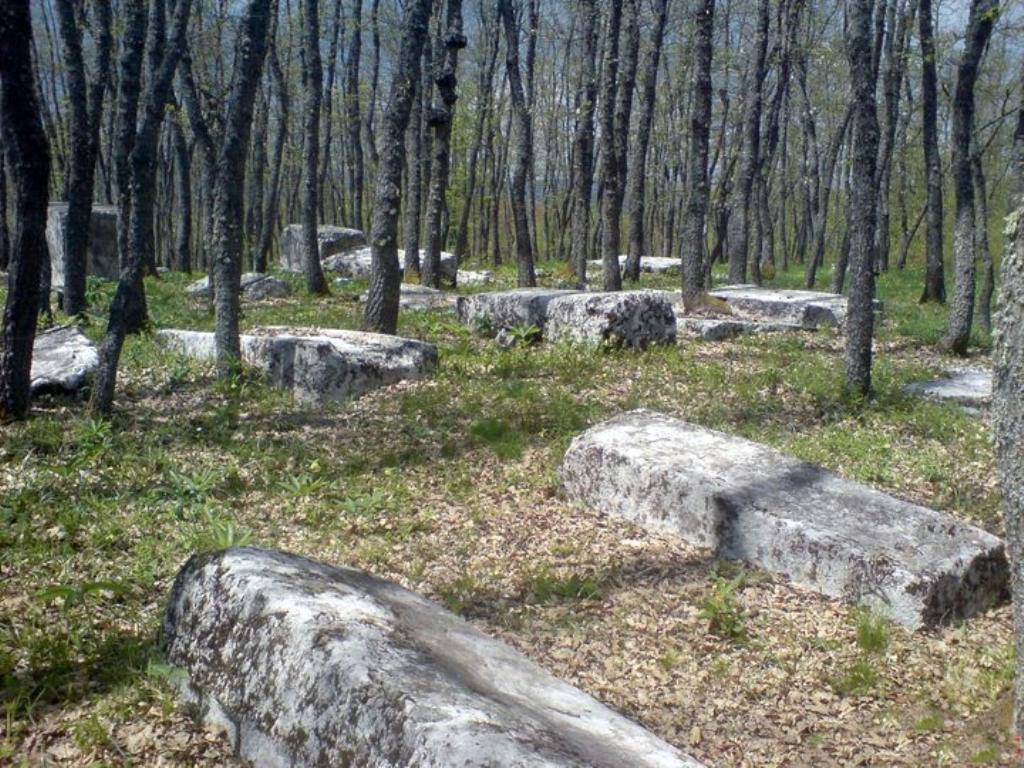

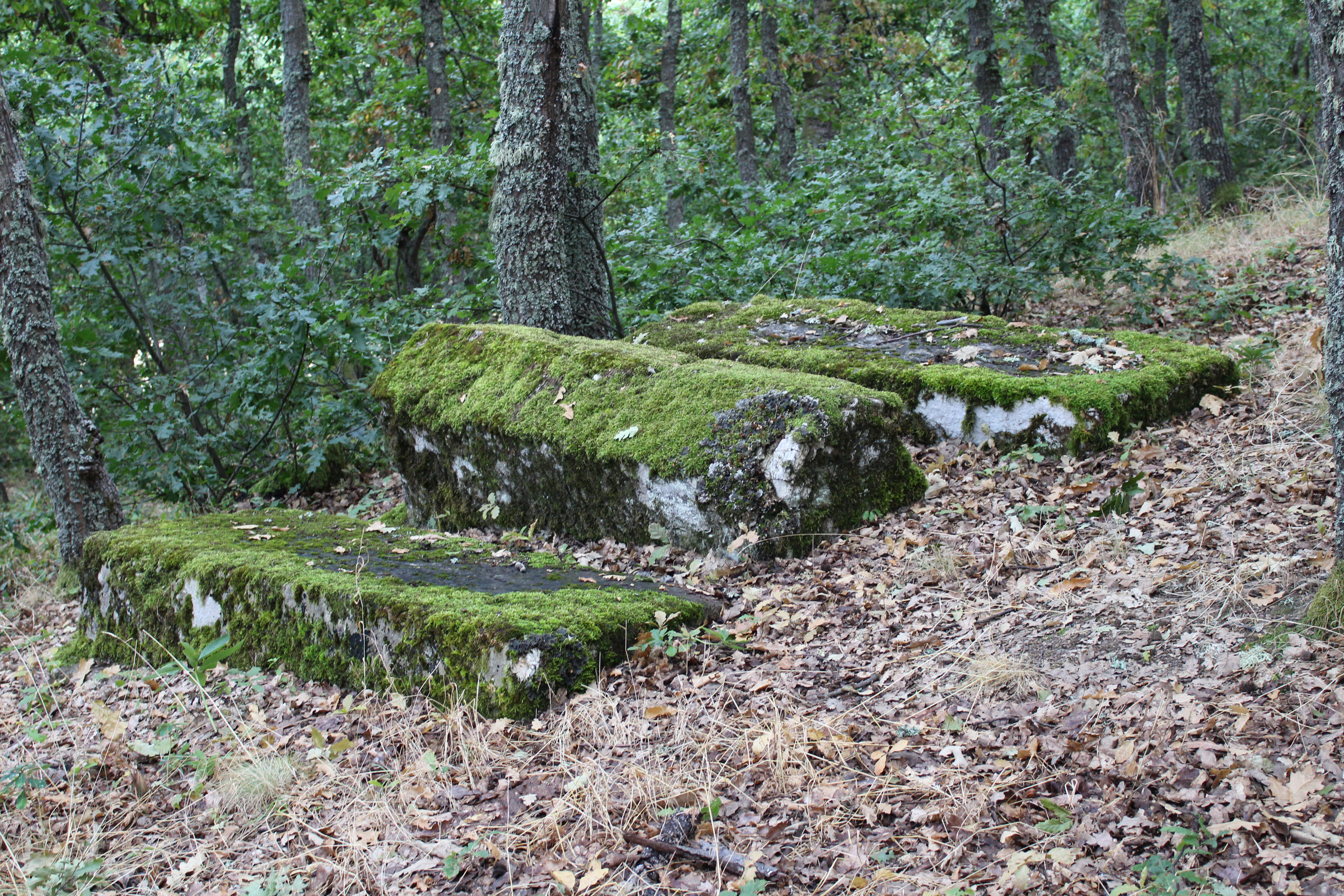

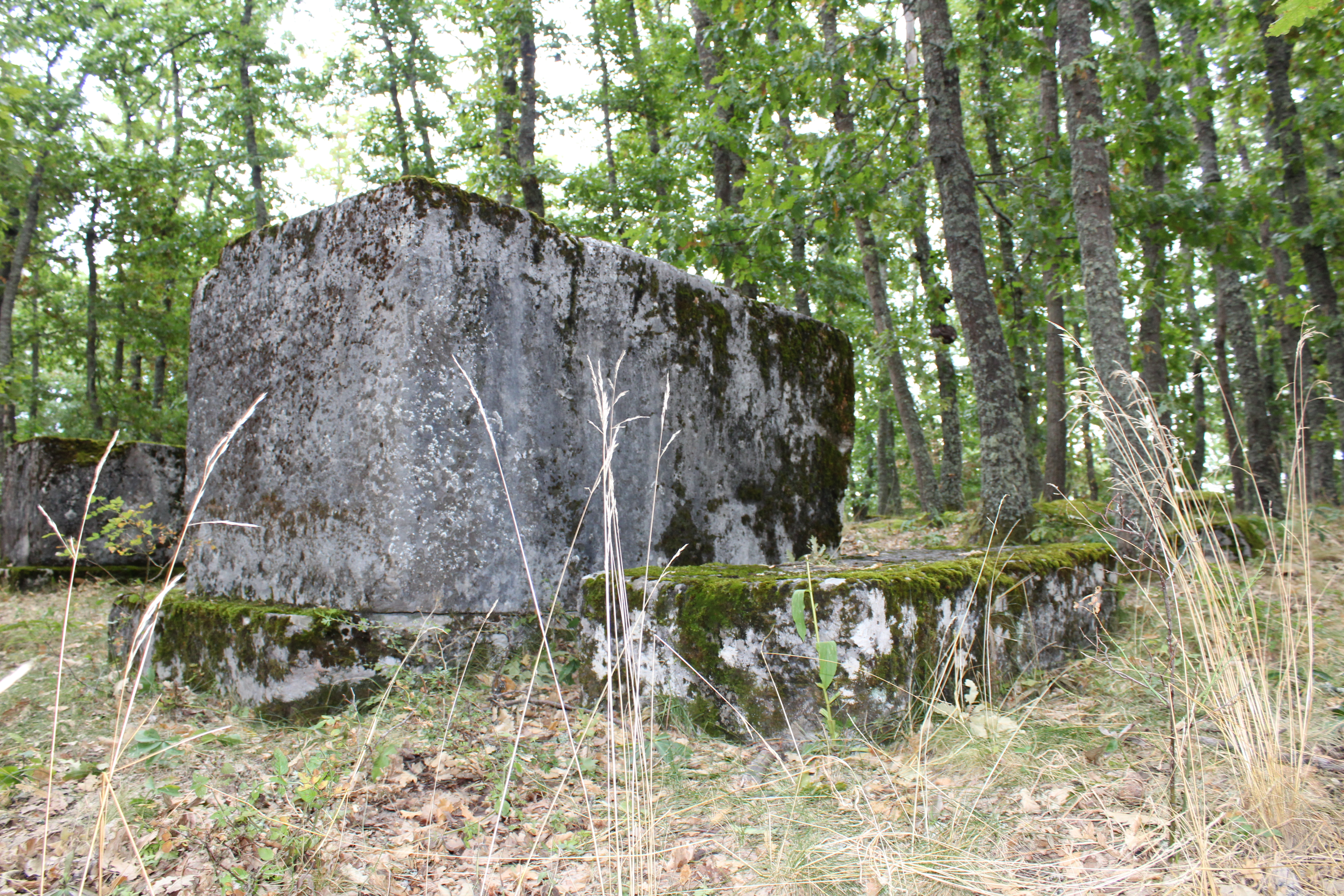

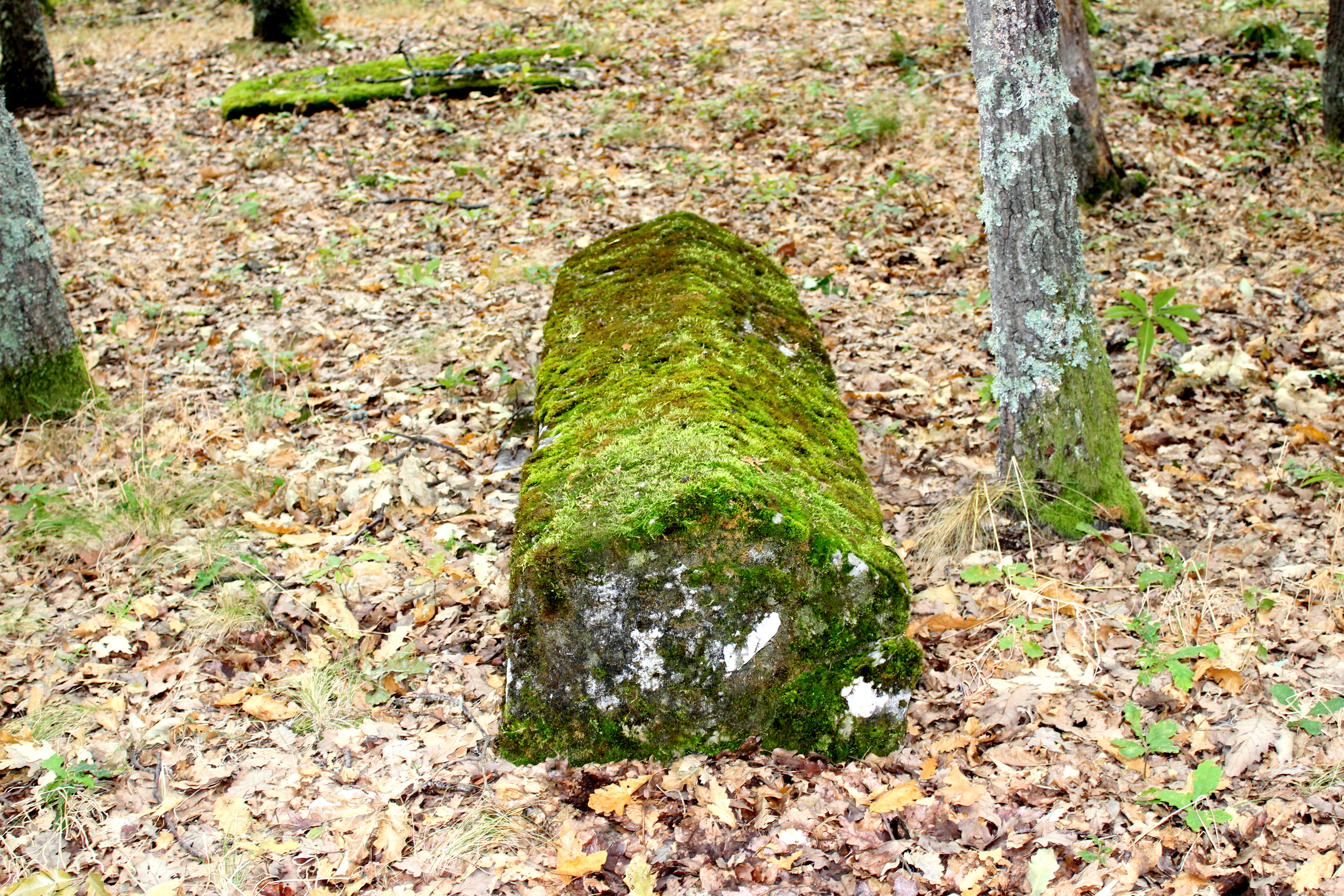

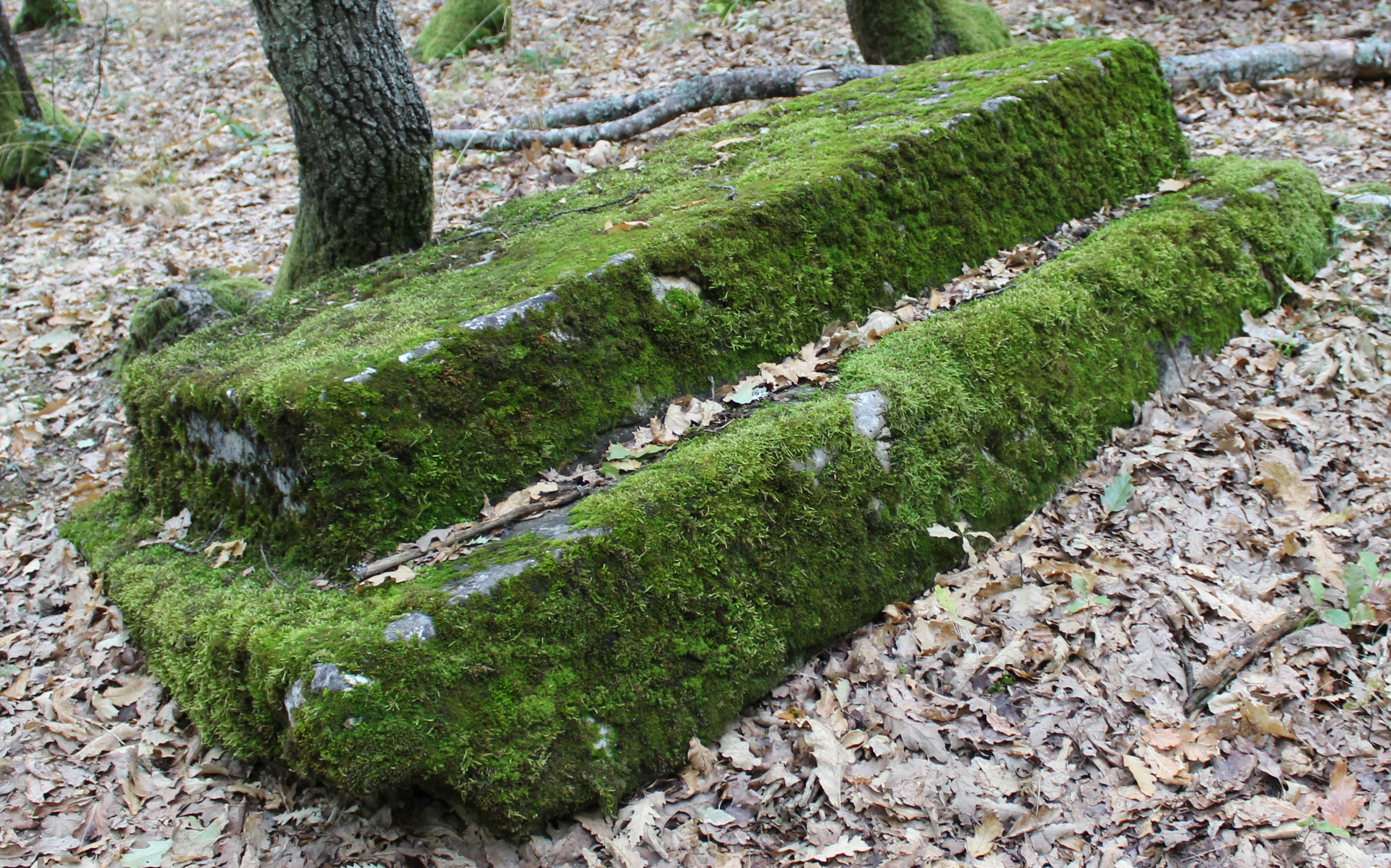

== Bibliography ==
- Kovačević-Kojić, Desanka, Gradska naselja srednjovjekovne Bosanske države, Veselin Masleša, Sarajevo, 1987.
- Anđelić, Pavao, Kulturna istorija Bosne i Hercegovine od najstarijih vremena do početka turske vladavine, Sarajevo, 1966.
- Bešlagić, Šefik, Stećci, Kataloško-topografski pregled, Sarajevo, 1971.
