= Burati =

Burati Бурати
- Village
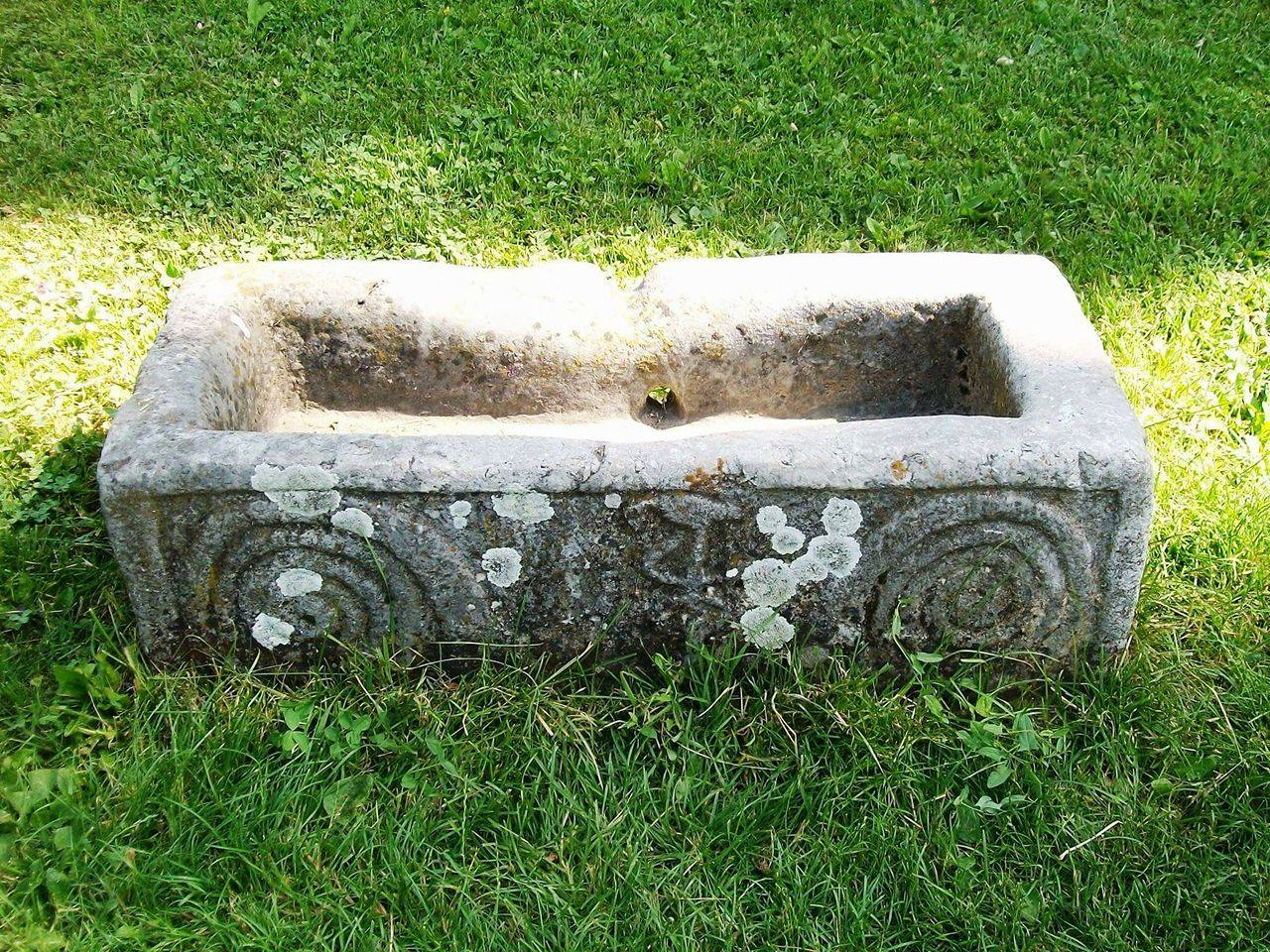
- Borak stećak necropolis near Burati

- Location within Bosnia and Herzegovina
- Coordinates: 43°50′12″N 18°52′50″E
- Country: Bosnia and Herzegovina
- Entity: Republika Srpska
- Municipality: Rogatica
- Time zone: UTC+1 (CET)
  - Summer (DST): UTC+2 (CEST)

Burati (Serbian Cyrillic: Бурати) is a village in the Republika Srpska, Bosnia and Herzegovina. According to the 1991 census, the village is located in the municipality of Rogatica.

Borak stećak necropolis near Burati is included in the UNESCO World Heritage list.

== See also ==
- Valery Burati
