= Jarovići (Rogatica) =

Jarovići Јаровићи
- Village
- Location within Bosnia and Herzegovina
- Coordinates: 43°47′05″N 18°53′41″E
- Country: Bosnia and Herzegovina
- Entity: Republika Srpska
- Municipality: Rogatica
- Time zone: UTC+1 (CET)
  - Summer (DST): UTC+2 (CEST)

Jarovići (Serbian Cyrillic: Јаровићи) is a village in the Republika Srpska, Bosnia and Herzegovina. According to the 1991 census, the village is located in the municipality of Rogatica.
