= Safet Zec =

Bosnian painter and graphic designer (born 1943)

- Born: Safet Zec; 5 December 1943 (age 82); Rogatica, Bosnia and Herzegovina
- Known for: Painting, Graphics
- Notable work: My Sister's Room, Series of paintings Srebrenica

Safet Zec (born 5 December 1943) is a Bosnian painter and graphic designer.

== Biography ==
Safet Zec was born in the town of Rogatica, then part of the Independent State of Croatia, to a Bosniak family. He graduated from the School of Applied Arts in Sarajevo in 1964. In 1969, Zec graduated from the University of Fine Arts in Belgrade, and then in 1972 completed his postgraduate studies at the same university.

In the seventies, Safet Zec became one of the major exhibitors of poetic realism. Until 1989, he lived and worked in Belgrade with his family, before returning to Sarajevo. He left Sarajevo in 1992 because of the Bosnian War, and fled to Udine, Italy. He was one of the most famous artists in Yugoslavia during the early nineties.

Safet Zec has prepared over 70 solo exhibitions in Bosnia and Herzegovina and in large cities around the world. He is also a member of the Association of Visual Artists of Bosnia and Herzegovina. He has won over 20 awards and is acknowledged for his work. In 2007 he was awarded with the Order of the Arts and Literature of France. His works are in major European and international galleries, as well as private collections.

Today he lives and works in Venice, Sarajevo, Paris, and Počitelj.

== Works ==
- My sister's room
- Bakarević's lodge
- A large room
- Houses and foliage
- Windows
- The big house in Bistrik that no longer exists
- Series of paintings Srebrenica
- Il pane della carità
