= Miloševići, Višegrad =

Miloševići Милошевићи
- Village
- Location within Bosnia and Herzegovina
- Coordinates: 43°50′27″N 19°13′50″E
- Country: Bosnia and Herzegovina
- Entity: Republika Srpska
- Municipality: Višegrad
- Time zone: UTC+1 (CET)
  - Summer (DST): UTC+2 (CEST)

Miloševići (Serbian Cyrillic: Милошевићи) is a village in the municipality of Višegrad, Bosnia and Herzegovina.

== Name ==
The name originates from the Serbian last name "Milošević" adding an "i" to the ending making it multiple

== History ==
In 1942, the Croatian fascist Ustaše regime slaughtered about 6,000 Serbs in Stari Brod near Rogatica and Miloševići.
