= Rogatica =

Rogatica Рогатица
- Town and municipality
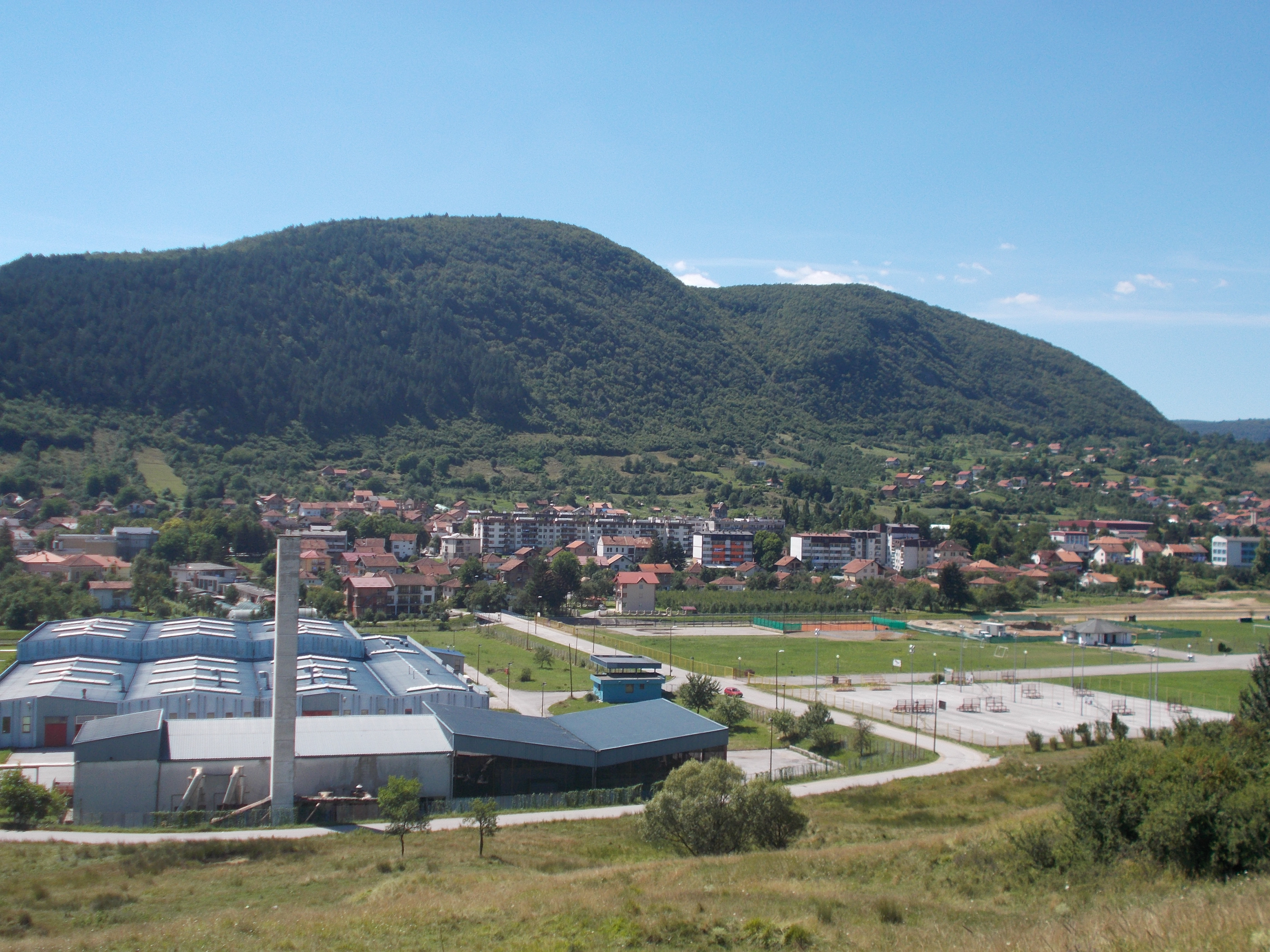
- View on Rogatica

- Location of Rogatica within Republika Srpska
- Coordinates: 43°47′55″N 19°00′13″E
- Country: Bosnia and Herzegovina
- Entity: Republika Srpska
- Geographical region: Podrinje

Government
  - Municipal mayor: Ninoslav Perić (SNSD)
  - Municipality: 645 km^{2} (249 sq mi)

Population (2013 census)
  - Town: 6,855
  - Municipality: 10,723
  - Municipality density: 16.6/km^{2} (43.1/sq mi)
- Time zone: UTC+1 (CET)
  - Summer (DST): UTC+2 (CEST)
- Area code: 57
- Website: www.rogatica.ba

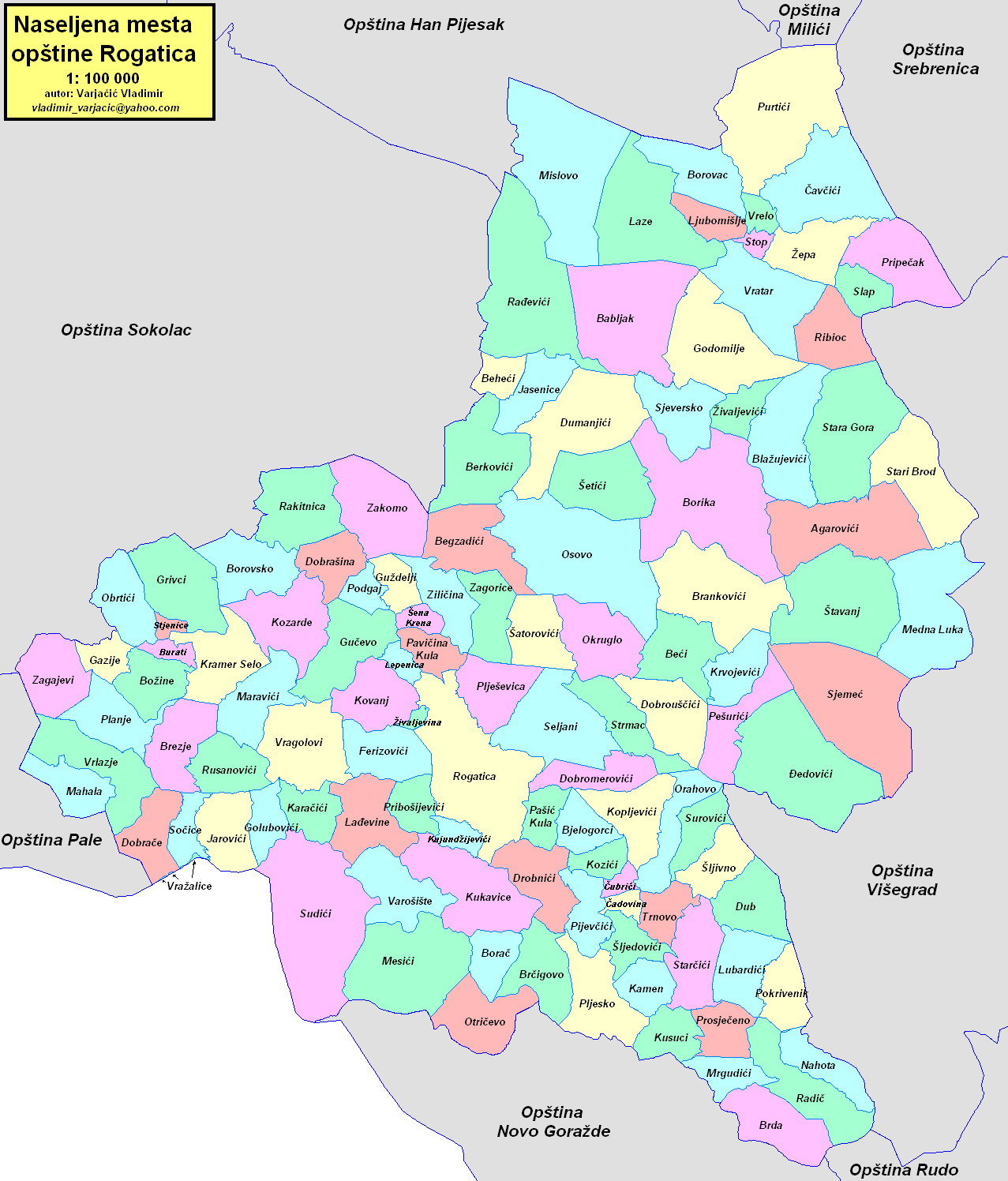
Settlements of Rogatica municipality

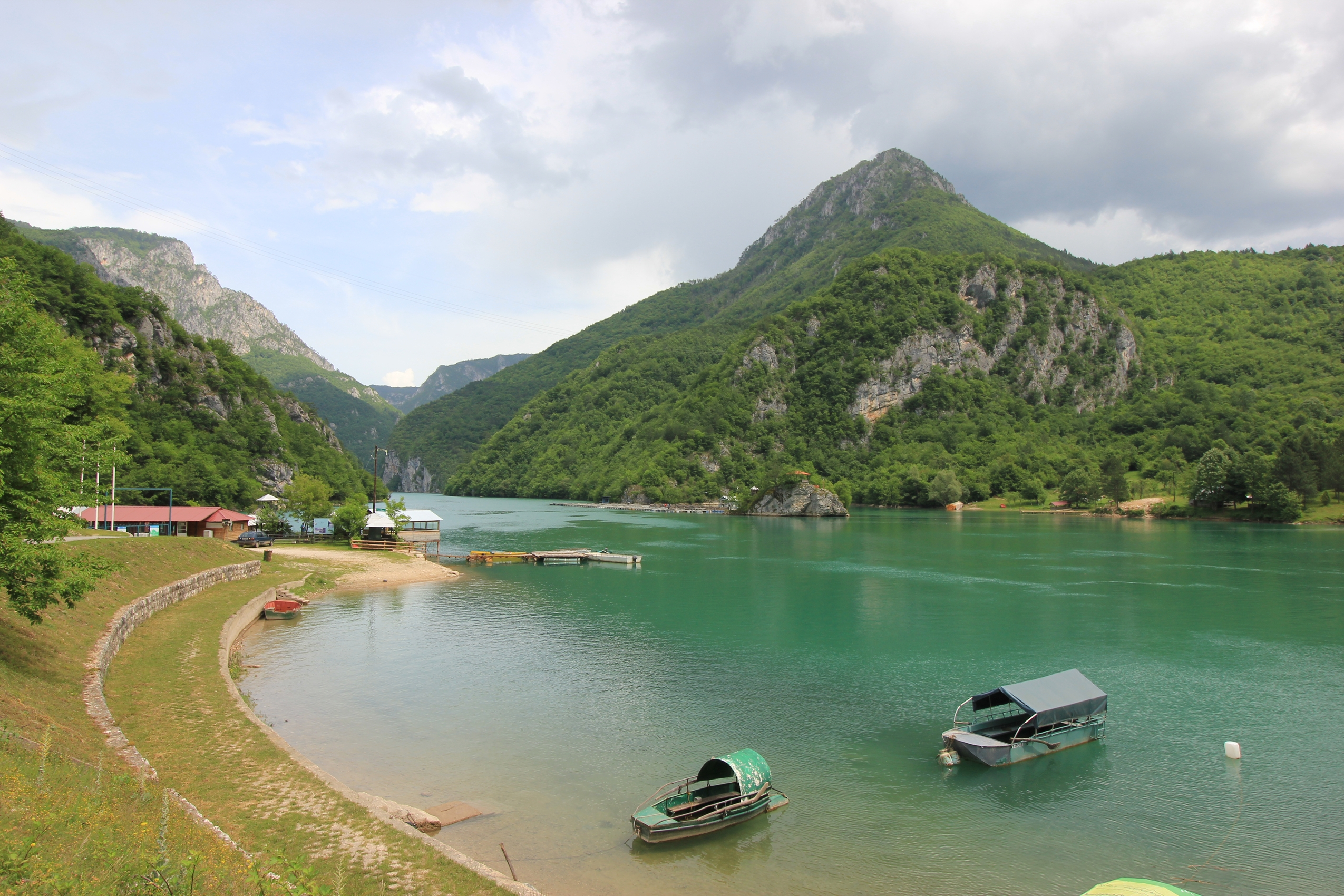
Drina River in Slap, Rogatica

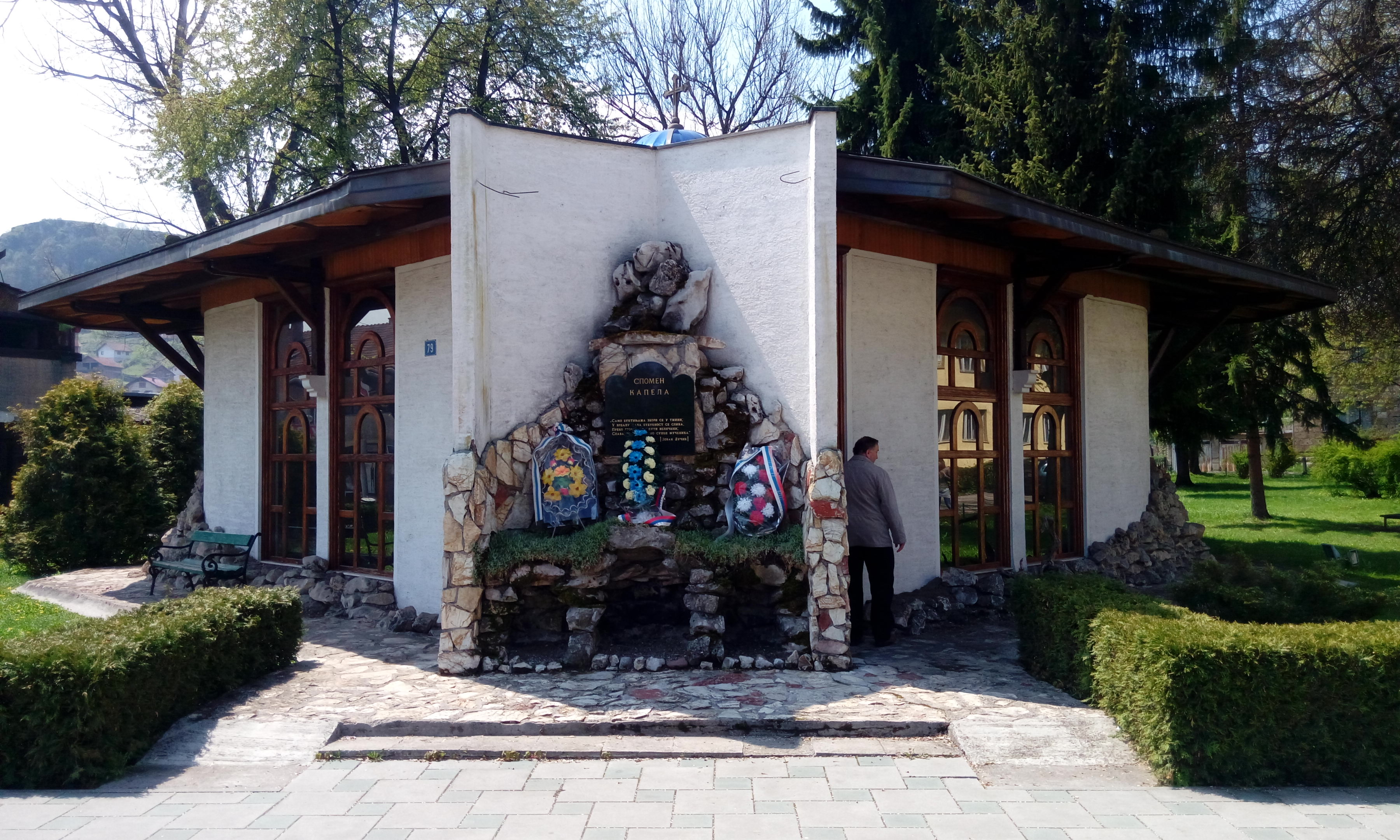
Monument dedicated to the fallen soldiers of the Bosnian Serb Army

Rogatica (Serbian Cyrillic: Рогатица, pronounced [rɔɡǎtit͡sa]) is a town and municipality in Republika Srpska, Bosnia and Herzegovina. As of 2013, the municipality has a population of 10,723 inhabitants, while the town of Rogatica itself has a population of 6,855 inhabitants.

== Geography ==
The town lies on the river Rakitnica, on the magistral road between Podromanija and Ustiprača, roughly 25 kilometres (16 mi) west of Višegrad and 45 km (28 mi) east of Sarajevo.

== History ==
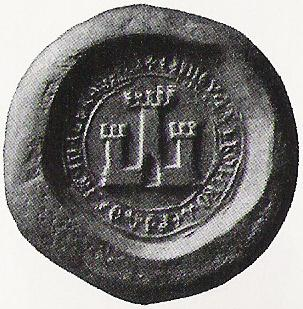
Seal of Pavlović noble family, with a depiction of Borač Castle

The history of Rogatica dates back to the ancient era, with typical remains of fortified settlements of the Illyrians.

Medieval Borač Castle was located about 10km south from Rogatica. It was a seat of the Pavlović noble family and one of the largest fortified cities on the territory of Bosnia in the 14th and 15th centuries.

Medieval artifacts from this area include numerous stećak monuments, some of exceptional historical value. Stećak from Banja Stijena and stećak Vlatka Vlađevića are preserved at the National Museum of Bosnia and Herzegovina in Sarajevo. Borak stećak necropolis near Burati is included in the UNESCO World Heritage list.

In 1463, the town, along with rest of the Kingdom of Bosnia, fell to the Ottoman Empire and was assigned to the Sanjak of Bosnia. The Ottomans referred to the town as Çelebi Pazar.

In 1878, Rogatica became a part of the Austro-Hungarian Empire. First school in Rogatica was established in 1880. Church of the Holy Trinity was built in the center of the city between 1883-86.

From October 1941 until January 1942, Serbian Chetniks killed about 2,000 Muslim civilians from the Rogatica district.

In 1942, the Croatian fascist Ustaše regime slaughtered about 6,000 Serbs in Stari Brod near Rogatica and Miloševići.

== Demographics ==
=== Population ===
Population of settlements – Rogatica municipality
	Settlement	1971.	1981.	1991.	2013.
	Total	25,501	23,771	21,812	10,723
1	Plješevica			454	426
2	Rogatica	4,792	6,496	8,916	6,855
3	Seljani			474	276

=== Ethnic composition ===
Ethnic composition – Rogatica town
	2013.	1991.	1981.	1971.
Total	6,855 (100,0%)	8,916 (100,0%)	6,496 (100,0%)	4,792 (100,0%)
Bosniaks		5,681 (63,72%)	3,855 (59,34%)	3,172 (66,19%)
Serbs		2,971 (33,32%)	1,998 (30,76%)	1,524 (31,80%)
Yugoslavs		140 (1,570%)	584 (8,990%)	41 (0,856%)
Others		108 (1,211%)	9 (0,139%)	17 (0,355%)
Croats		16 (0,179%)	21 (0,323%)	25 (0,522%)
Montenegrins			15 (0,231%)	10 (0,209%)
Albanians			9 (0,139%)	2 (0,042%)
Slovenes			4 (0,062%)	1 (0,021%)
Macedonians			1 (0,015%)	

Ethnic composition – Rogatica municipality
	2013.	1991.	1981.	1971.
Total	10,723 (100,0%)	21 978 (100,0%)	23,771 (100,0%)	25,501 (100,0%)
Serbs	9,527 (88,85%)	8,391 (38,18%)	8,877 (37,34%)	10,208 (40,03%)
Bosniaks	1,117 (10,42%)	13,209 (60,10%)	14,020 (58,98%)	15,096 (59,20%)
Others	60 (0,560%)	173 (0,787%)	31 (0,130%)	66 (0,259%)
Croats	19 (0,177%)	19 (0,086%)	32 (0,135%)	45 (0,176%)
Yugoslavs		186 (0,846%)	762 (3,206%)	62 (0,243%)
Montenegrins			22 (0,093%)	17 (0,067%)
Albanians			20 (0,084%)	4 (0,016%)
Slovenes			5 (0,021%)	1 (0,004%)
Macedonians			2 (0,008%)	2 (0,008%)

== Economy ==
The following table gives a preview of total number of registered people employed in legal entities per their core activity (as of 2018):

Activity	Total
Agriculture, forestry and fishing	255
Mining and quarrying	-
Manufacturing	363
Electricity, gas, steam and air conditioning supply	69
Water supply; sewerage, waste management and remediation activities	65
Construction	30
Wholesale and retail trade, repair of motor vehicles and motorcycles	346
Transportation and storage	48
Accommodation and food services	71
Information and communication	15
Financial and insurance activities	25
Real estate activities	-
Professional, scientific and technical activities	22
Administrative and support service activities	6
Public administration and defense; compulsory social security	180
Education	149
Human health and social work activities	104
Arts, entertainment and recreation	26
Other service activities	29
Total	1,803

== Notable people ==
- Zehra Bajraktarević, singer
- Kemal Mešić, athlete
- Muhamed Mustafić, handball player
- Ibrahim Šehić, football goalkeeper
- Mersad Selimbegović, football player
- Nezir Škaljić, third mayor of Sarajevo (1899–1905)
- Safet Zec, painter

== Gallery ==
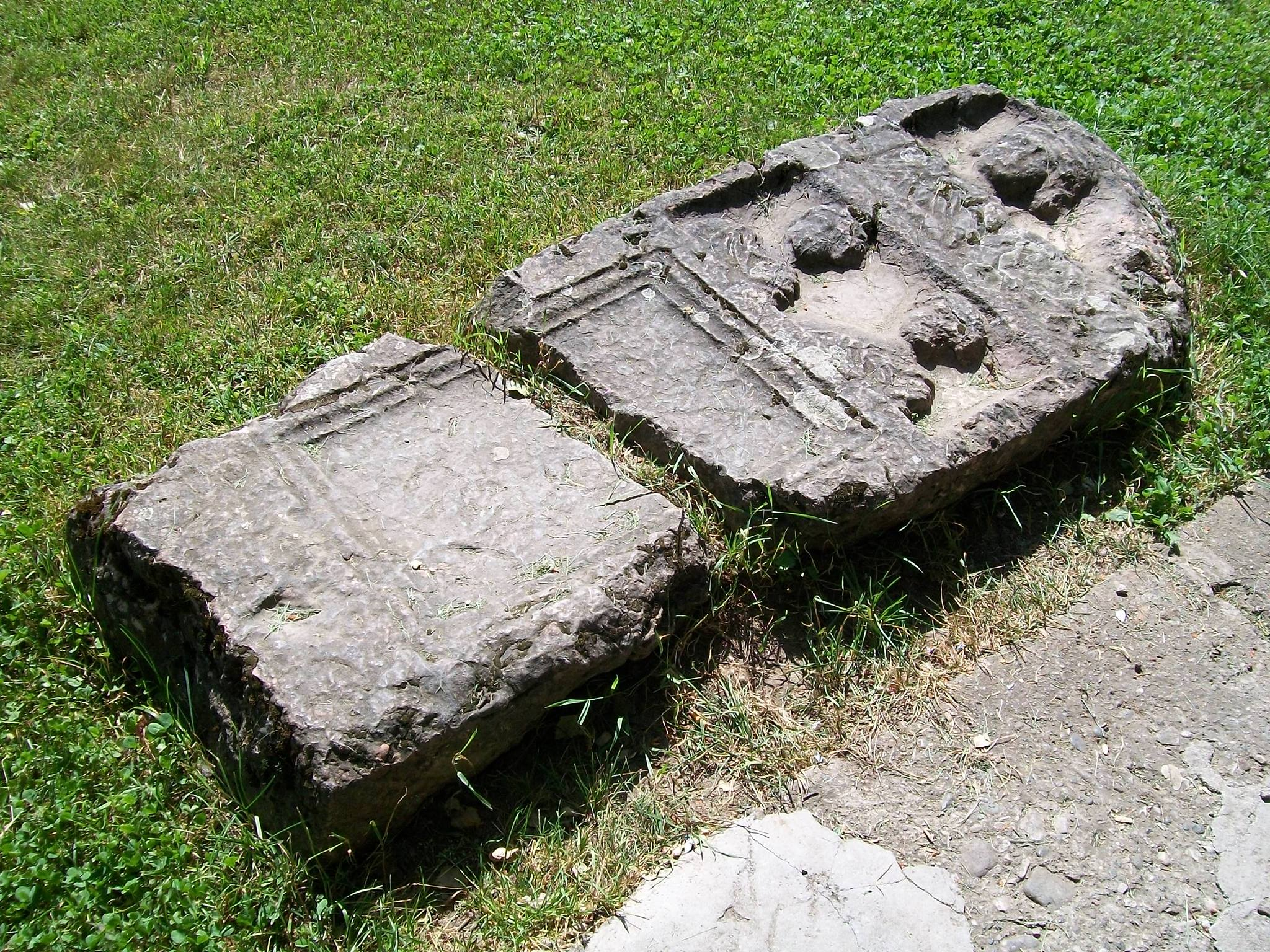
Ancient Roman tomb

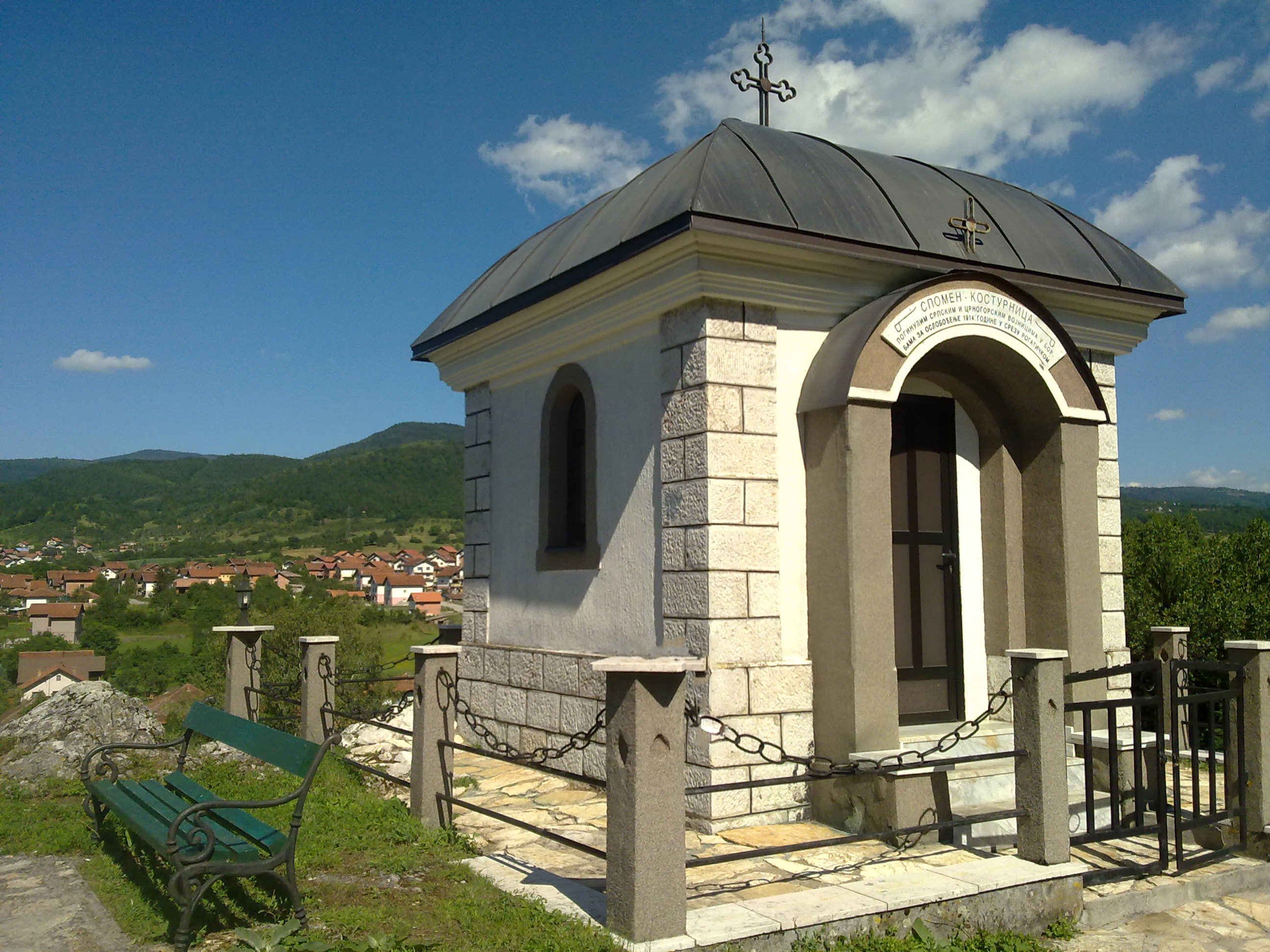
Ossuary of the Serbian Army member killed in action in World War I

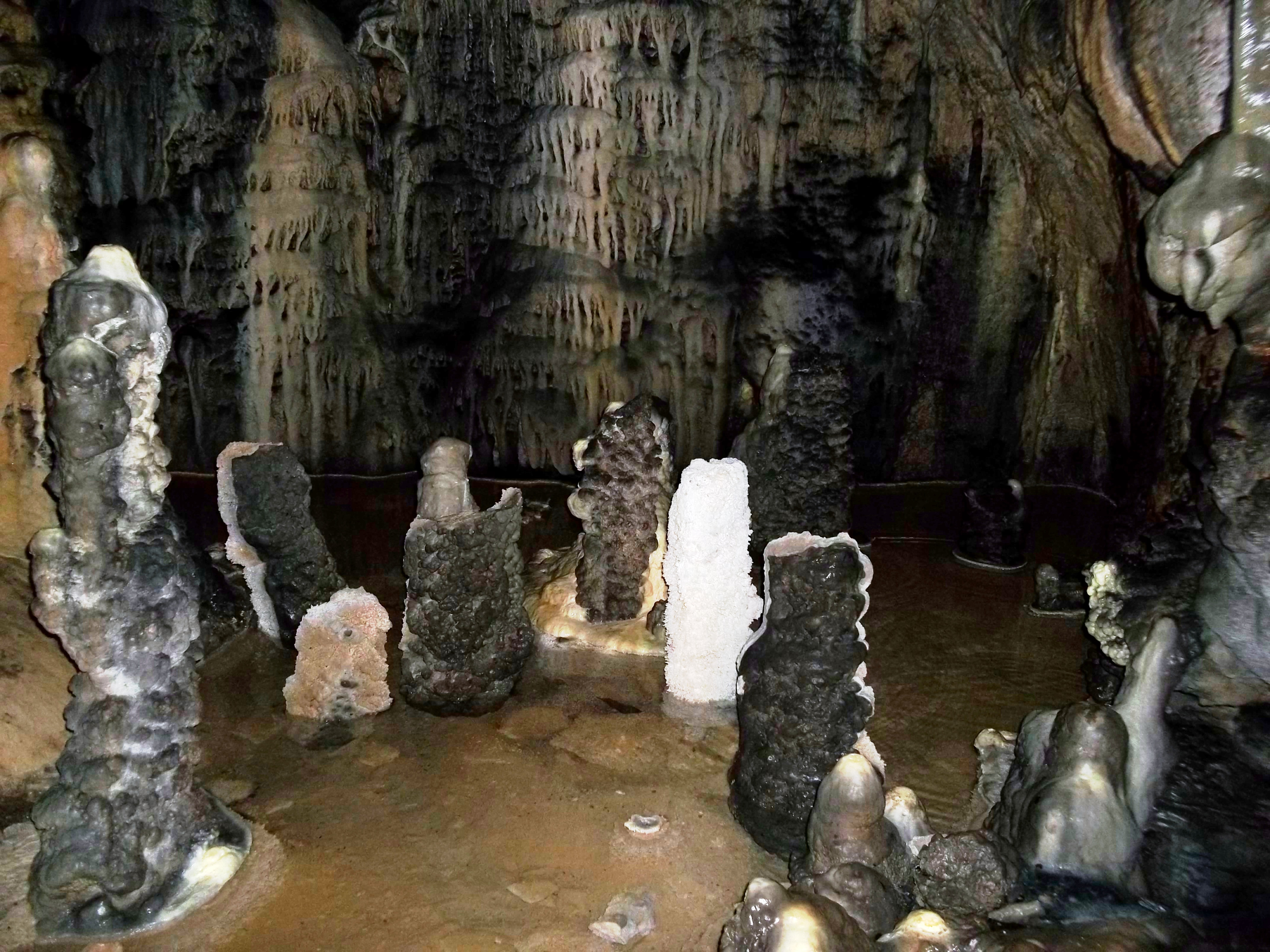
Banja Stijena

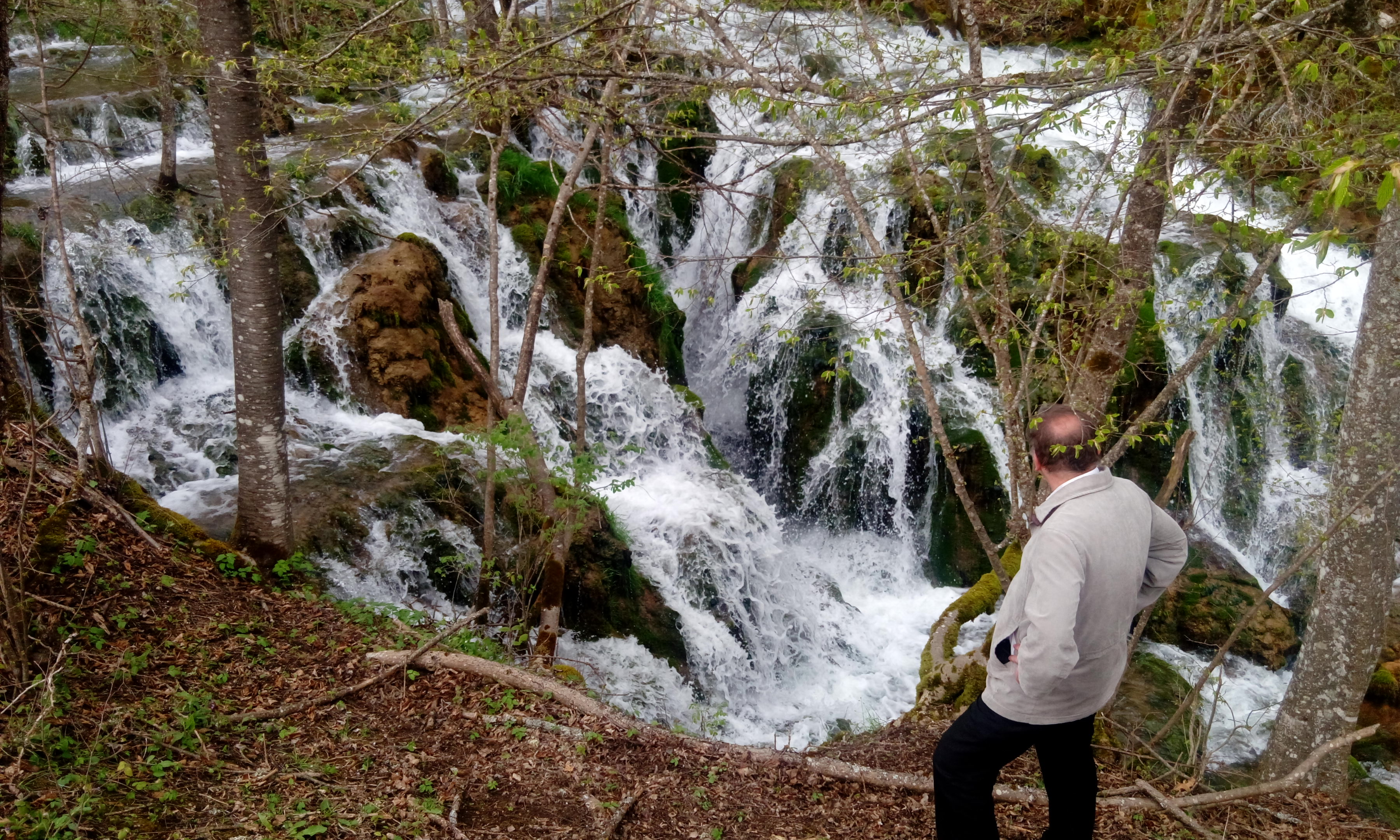
Waterfall located in the municipality

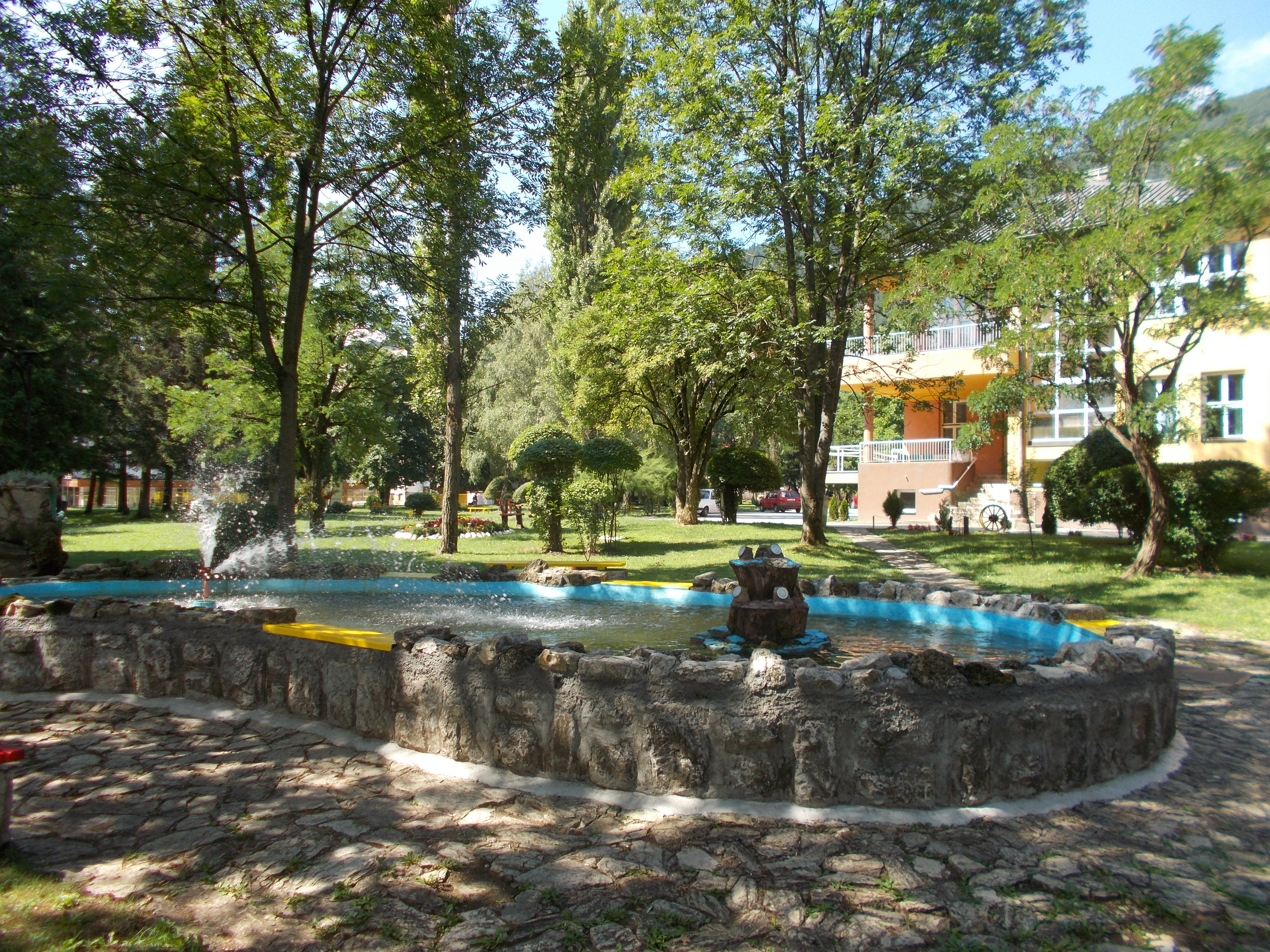
Park in the city

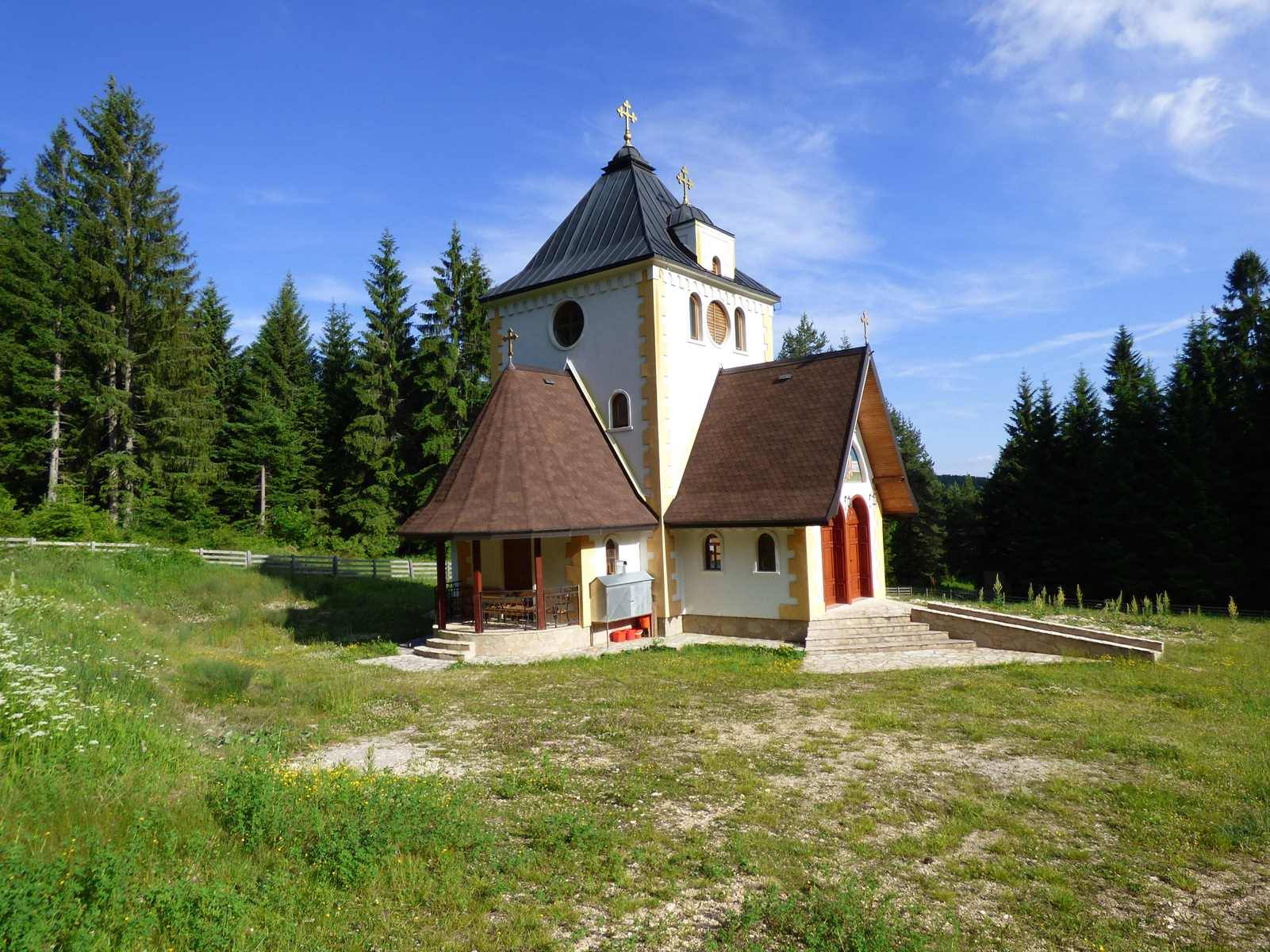
Monastery of Saint John the Baptist

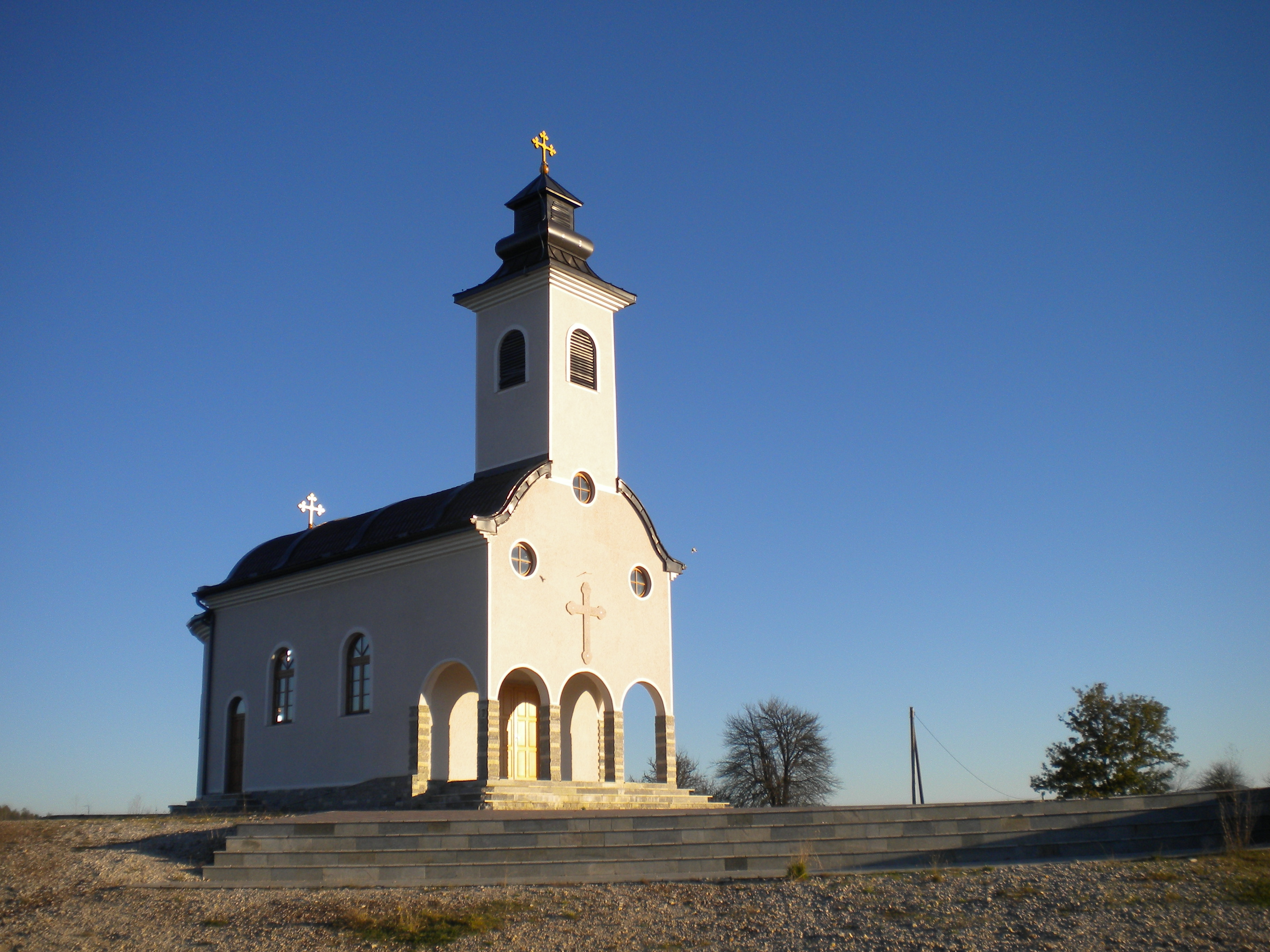
Church in Obrtići

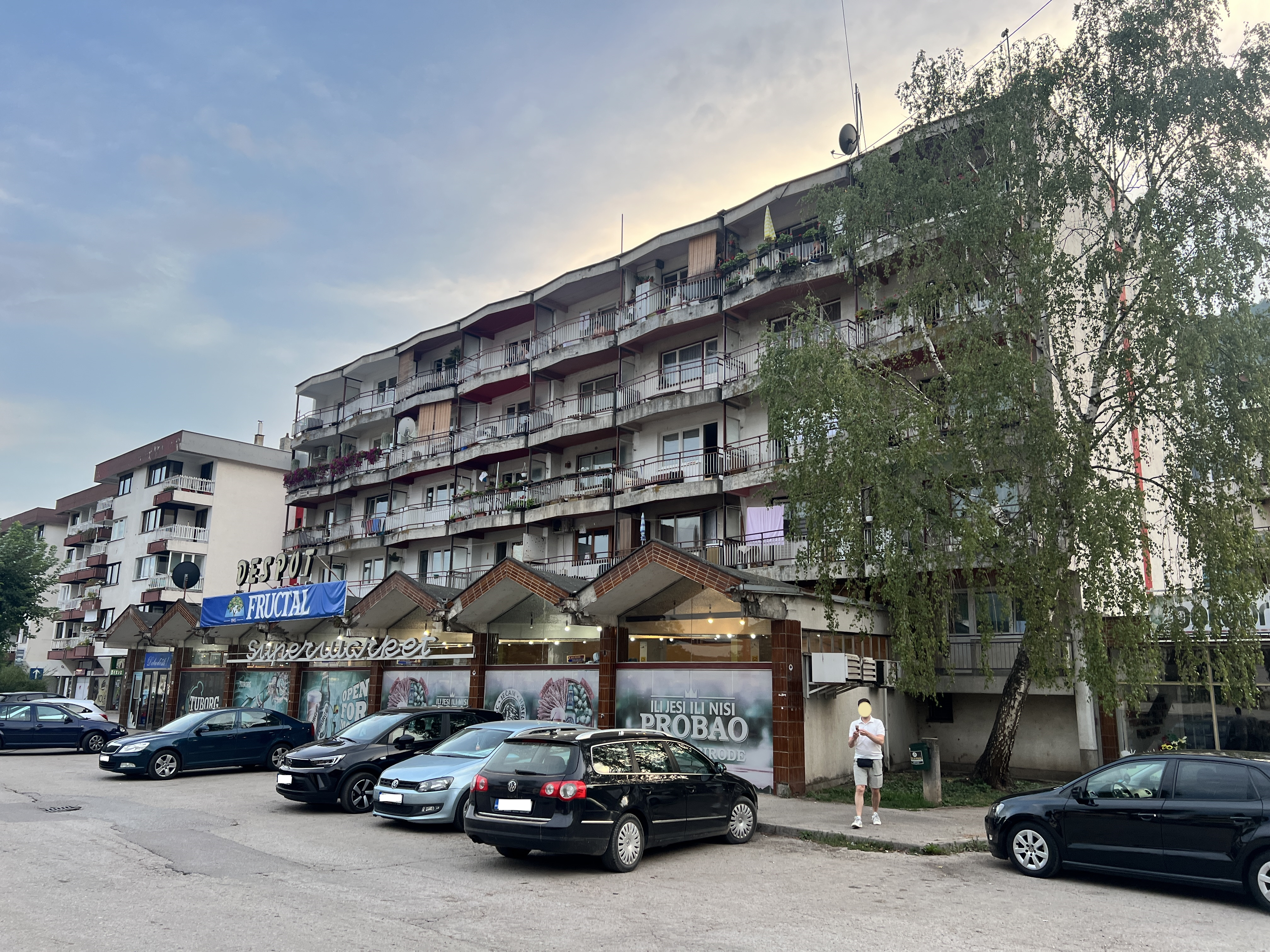
Despot supermarket and residential building in the town of Rogatica, Bosnia and Herzegovina.
