= Bosniaks =

South Slavic ethnic group

Bošnjaci
- Flag of the Republic of Bosnia and Herzegovina, today used as an ethnic flag

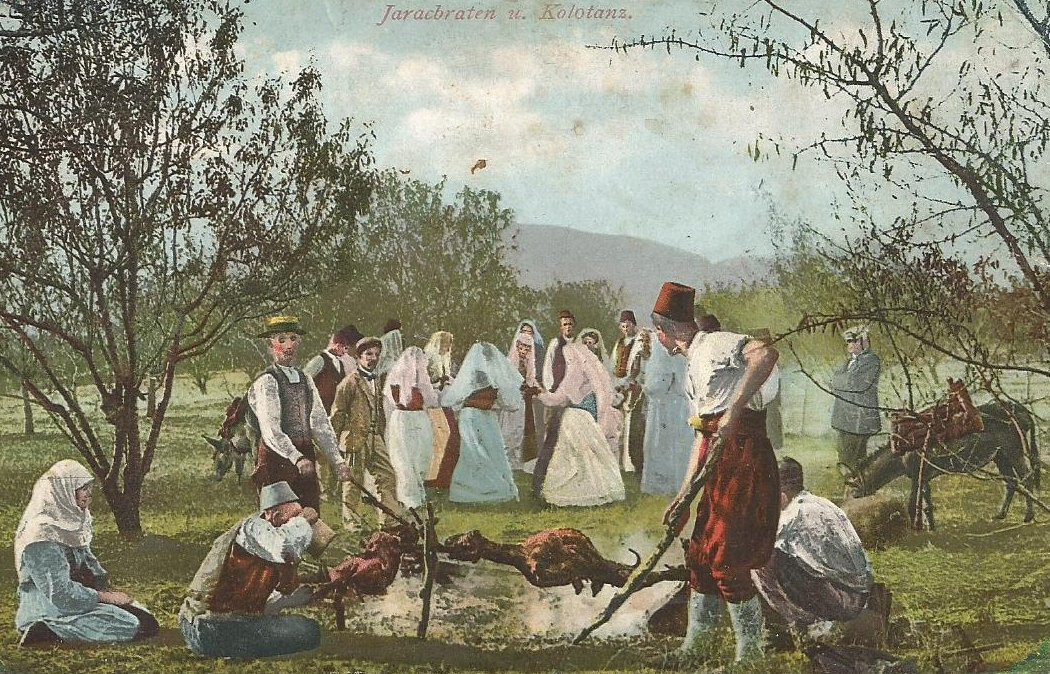
- 1895 painting of Bosniaks roasting a lamb and dancing the kolo

Total population
- c. 3.5 million (high estimate) (Note: Foreign censuses or governmental estimates frequently categorize the Bosnian diaspora based on national/citizenship origin rather than sub-national ethnicities meaning that Bosniaks are categorized together with other ethnic groups from Bosnia-Herzegovina thus obscuring the exact number of Bosniaks in these countries.The global Bosnian diaspora is however estimated at around two million of whom a majority are considered to be Bosniak. Halilovich, Hariz & Hasic, Jasmin & Karabegovic, Dzeneta & Karamehic-Muratovic, Ajlina & Oruc, Nermin. (2018). Mapping the Bosnian-Herzegovinian Diaspora: Utilizing the Socio-Economic Potential of the Diaspora for Development of BiH. (PDF), International Organization for Migration, Ministry of Human Rights and Refugees B&H, 2018, archived (PDF) from the original on 2 May 2025)

Regions with significant populations
- Bosnia and Herzegovina 1,769,592

Significant Bosniak diaspora
- Turkey: c. 115,000, by ancestry c. 2,000,000
- United States: c. 100,000
- Serbia: 153,801
- Montenegro: 58,956
- Canada: c. 50,000
- Kosovo: 26,841
- Croatia: 24,131
- Slovenia: 21,542
- Denmark: 21,000
- North Macedonia: 17,018
- Australia: 14,620

Languages
- Bosnian

Religion
- Sunni Islam

Related ethnic groups
- Other South Slavs, especially Bosnian Serbs, Bosnian Croats

Bosniaks (Note: Bosnian: Bošnjaci, Cyrillic: Бошњаци, pronounced [boʃɲǎːtsi]; singular masculine: Bošnjak [bǒʃɲaːk], feminine: Bošnjakinja) are a South Slavic ethnic group and nation native to Bosnia and Herzegovina and constitute the largest ethnic group in Bosnia and Herzegovina, followed by Serbs and Croats. They share a common ancestry, culture, history and language emanating from the Bosnian historical region; and traditionally and predominantly adhere to Sunni Islam for which reason they are often also referred to as Bosnian Muslims although this is an imprecise ethnic descriptor today. The Bosniaks constitute significant native communities in Serbia, Montenegro, Croatia and Kosovo as well. Largely due to displacement stemming from the Bosnian War and Genocide in the 1990s, they also form a significant diaspora with several Bosniak communities across Europe, the Americas and Oceania.

Slavs settled the present-day territory of Bosnia and Herzegovina in the 7th to 9th centuries amid the Migration Period. By the 12th century, they had formed an independent Bosnian state that would evolve into a kingdom by the late 14th century. Throughout the High Middle Ages, the Bosnian state was characterised by a disorganised Christian religious plurality, often accused of heresy due to a weak church organisation, brought about by rugged, mountainous terrain and poor communications with both Rome and Constantinople. Following the Ottoman conquest of the Kingdom of Bosnia in 1463, a distinct, native community of Bosnian Muslims began to form as the local Slavic population embraced Islam, mainly in the 16th century. Despite an initially steep increase upwards to three-fourths of the Bosnian population at its height, wars and plagues would later, throughout Ottoman rule, decimate the Bosnian Muslim population, who, in contrast to their rural Christian counterparts, lived in more densely populated urban centres and were obligated to partake in Ottoman military campaigns. In the late 17th and early 18th century, Bosnia received a large influx of around 130,000 Muslim refugees from Ottoman territories lost in Hungary, Slavonia, Croatia and Dalmatia. These included both descendants of earlier migrants from Bosnia and local converts to Islam. Significant migrations of Slavic Muslims also occurred during the 19th century from present-day Serbia and Montenegro following the Serbian Revolution, when around 40,000 Slavic Muslims settled in Bosnia and Herzegovina.

During Ottoman rule, the social and cultural life of the population in Bosnia and Herzegovina was structured along religious lines, and the term Bosniak was primarily used as a territorial designation, with ethnic or national self-identification absent among the population, regardless of religious affiliation. With the collapse of Ottoman rule and the rise of European nationalism in the 19th century, a tri-ethnic reality was established in Bosnia and Herzegovina, as Bosnian Catholics and Eastern Orthodox Christians were gradually incorporated into the neighbouring Croat and Serb national identities. For the Bosnian Muslims, interposed between the stronger and rivalling Serb and Croat national movements, and weakened by large-scale emigration to Ottoman Turkey and the loss of influence, the process of ethno-national self-determination would proceed well into the late 20th century when the Republic of Bosnia and Herzegovina declared its independence and the Bosnian Muslims affirmed the Bosniak name for their nation. Today Bosniaks are recognized by the Dayton Agreement and the constitution of Bosnia and Herzegovina as one of the three constitutive nations of Bosnia and Herzegovina alongside Serbs and Croats.

Contemporary genetic studies have shown the three main ethnic groups of Bosnia and Herzegovina (Bosniaks, Bosnian Serbs and Bosnian Croats) to share, in spite of some lesser quantitative differences, a large fraction of the same ancient gene pool distinct for the region. Analyses have moreover revealed no significant difference between the population of Bosnia and Herzegovina and neighbouring populations.

== Etymology ==
According to the Bosniak entry in the Oxford English Dictionary, the first preserved use of "Bosniak" in English was by English diplomat and historian Paul Rycaut in 1680 as Bosnack, cognate with post-classical Latin Bosniacus (1682 or earlier), French Bosniaque (1695 or earlier) or German Bosniak (1737 or earlier). The modern spelling is contained in the 1836 Penny Cyclopaedia V. 231/1: "The inhabitants of Bosnia are composed of Bosniaks, a race of Sclavonian origin". In the Slavic languages, -ak is a common suffix appended to words to create a masculine noun, for instance also found in the ethnonym of Poles (Polak) and Slovaks (Slovák). As such, "Bosniak" is etymologically equivalent to its non-ethnic counterpart "Bosnian" (which entered English around the same time via the Middle French, Bosnien): a native of Bosnia.

From the perspective of Bosniaks, bosanstvo (Bosnianhood) and bošnjaštvo (Bosniakhood) are closely and mutually interconnected, as Bosniaks connect their identity with Bosnia and Herzegovina.

The earliest attestation to a Bosnian ethnonym emerged with the historical term "Bošnjanin" (Latin: Bosniensis) which denoted the people of the medieval Bosnian Kingdom. By the 15th century, the suffix -(n)in had been replaced by -ak to create the current form Bošnjak (Bosniak), first attested in the diplomacy of Bosnian king Tvrtko II who in 1440 dispatched a delegation (Apparatu virisque insignis) to the Polish king of Hungary, Władysław Warneńczyk (1440–1444), asserting a common Slavic ancestry and language between the Bosniak and Pole. The Miroslav Krleža Lexicographical Institute thus defines Bosniak as "the name for the subjects of the Bosnian rulers in the pre-Ottoman era, subjects of the Sultans during the Ottoman era, and the current name for the most numerous of the three constituent peoples in Bosnia and Herzegovina. Bosniak, as well as the older term Bošnjanin (in Lat. Bosnensis), is originally a name defining the inhabitants of the medieval Bosnian state".

Linguists have most commonly proposed the toponym Bosnia to be derived from the eponymous river Bosna; widely believed to be a pre-Slavic hydronym in origin and possibly mentioned for the first time during the 1st century AD by Roman historian Marcus Velleius Paterculus as Bathinus flumen.

Linguist Petar Skok expressed an opinion that the chronological transformation of this hydronym from the Roman times to its final Slavicization occurred in the following order; *Bassanus> *Bassenus> *Bassinus> *Bosina> Bosьna> Bosna.

According to the English medievalist William Miller in the work Essays on the Latin Orient (1921), the Slavic settlers in Bosnia "adapted the Latin designation [...] Basante, to their own idiom by calling the stream Bosna and themselves Bosniaks [...]".

== History ==
=== Origins ===
The Early Slavs, a people from northeastern Europe, settled the territory of Bosnia and Herzegovina (and neighboring regions) after the sixth century (amid the Migration Period), and were composed of small tribal units drawn from a single Slavic confederation known to the Byzantines as the Sclaveni (whilst the related Antes, roughly speaking, colonized the eastern portions of the Balkans).

Recent Anglophone scholarship has tended to downplay the role of migrations. For example, Timothy Gregory conjectures that "It is now generally agreed that the people who lived in the Balkans after the Slavic "invasions" were probably, for the most part, the same as those who had lived there earlier, although the creation of new political groups and the arrival of small numbers of immigrants caused people to look at themselves as distinct from their neighbours, including the Byzantines." However, the archaeological evidence paints a picture of widespread depopulation, perhaps a tactical re-settlement of Byzantine populations from provincial hinterlands to Coastal towns after 620 CE.

In former Yugoslav historiography, a second migration of "Serb" and "Croat" tribes (variously placed in the 7th to 9th century) is viewed as that of elites imposing themselves on a more numerous and 'amorphous' Slavic populace, however such a paradigm needs to be clarified empirically.

Eighth-century sources mention early Slavophone polities, such as the Guduscani in northern Dalmatia, the principality of Slavs in Lower Pannonia, and that of Serbs (Sorabos) who were 'said to hold much of Dalmatia'.

The earliest reference to Bosnia as such is the De Administrando Imperio, written by the Byzantine Emperor Constantine Porphyrogenitus (r. 913–959). At the end of chapter 32 ("Of the Serbs and of the country they now dwell in"), after a detailed political history, Porphyrogenitus asserts that the prince of Serbia has always submitted himself to Rome, in preference to Rome's regional rivals, the Bulgarians. He then gives two lists of kastra oikoumena (inhabited cities), the first being those "en tē baptismenē serbia" (in baptized Serbia; six listed), the second being "εἱς τὸ χορίον Βόσονα, τὸ Κάτερα καί τὸ Δεσνήκ / eis to chorion Bosona, to Katera kai to Desnēk" (in the territory of Bosona, [the cities of] Katera and Desnik).

To Tibor Živković, this suggests that from a tenth-century Byzantine viewpoint, Bosnia was a territory within the principality of Serbia. The implicit distinction made by Porphyrogenitus between "baptised Serbia" and the territory of Bosona is noteworthy.

Subsequently, Bosnia might have been nominally vassal to various rulers from Croatia and Duklja, but by the end of the twelfth century, it came to form an independent unit under an autonomous ruler, Ban Kulin, who called himself Bosnian.

In the 14th century, a Bosnian kingdom centred on the river Bosna emerged. Its people, when not using local (county, regional) names, called themselves Bosnians.

Following the conquest of Bosnia by the Ottoman Empire in the mid-15th century, there was a rapid and extensive wave of conversion from Christianity to Islam, and by the early 1600s roughly two-thirds of Bosnians were Muslim. In addition, a smaller number of converts from outside Bosnia were in time assimilated into the common Bosniak unit. These included Croats (mainly from Turkish Croatia), the Muslims of Slavonia who fled to Bosnia following the Austro-Turkish war), Serbian and Montenegrin Muhacirs (in Sandžak particularly Islamicized descendants of the Old Herzegovinian and highlander tribes from Brda region, such as Rovčani, Moračani, Drobnjaci and Kuči), and slavicized Vlachs, Albanians and German Saxons.

Bosniaks are generally defined as the South Slavic nation on the territory of the former Yugoslavia whose members identify themselves with Bosnia and Herzegovina as their ethnic state and are part of such a common nation, and of whom a majority are Muslim by religion. Nevertheless, leaders and intellectuals of the Bosniak community may have various perceptions of what it means to be Bosniak. Some may point to an Islamic heritage, while others stress the purely secular and national character of the Bosniak identity and its connection with Bosnian territory and history.

For the duration of Ottoman rule, the multiconfessional community of Bosnia was delineated primarily by faith rather than ethnic or national conceptualisation, and "Bosniak" came to refer to all inhabitants of Bosnia as a territorial designation. When Austria-Hungary occupied Bosnia and Herzegovina in 1878, national identification in the modern sense had been a largely foreign concept to Bosnians of both the Christian and Muslim faiths, substantially lagging behind the Romantic nationalism of Europe at the time. In this regard, Christian Bosnians had not described themselves as either Serbs or Croats before the 19th century, particularly before the Austrian occupation, when the current tri-ethnic reality of Bosnia and Herzegovina was configured based on religious affiliation. For the Muslim Bosnians, this process was further delayed not least by the wish to retain local privileges bestowed upon them by the social structure of Ottoman Bosnia.

=== Arrival of the Slavs ===
The western Balkans had been reconquered from "barbarians" by the Byzantine Emperor Justinian (r. 527–565). Sclaveni (Slavs) raided the western Balkans, including Bosnia, in the 6th century. The De Administrando Imperio (DAI; ca. 960) mentions Bosnia (Βοσωνα/Bosona) as a "small/little land" (or "small country", χοριον Βοσωνα/horion Bosona) part of Byzantium, having been settled by Slavic groups along with the river Bosna, Zahumlje and Travunija (both with territory in modern-day Bosnia and Herzegovina); This is the first mention of a Bosnian entity; it was not a national entity, but a geographical one, mentioned strictly as an integral part of Byzantium. Some scholars assert that the inclusion of Bosnia in Serbia merely reflects the status in DAI's time. In the Early Middle Ages, Fine, Jr. claims that what is today western Bosnia and Herzegovina was part of Croatia, while the rest was divided between Croatia and Serbia.

After the death of Serbian ruler Časlav (r. ca. 927–960), Bosnia seems to have broken away from the Serbian state and became politically independent. Bulgaria briefly subjugated Bosnia at the turn of the 10th century, after which it became part of the Byzantine Empire. In the 11th century, Bosnia was part of the Serbian state of Duklja.

In 1137, the Kingdom of Hungary annexed most of the Bosnia region, then briefly lost it in 1167 to Byzantium before regaining her in the 1180s. Before 1180 (the reign of Ban Kulin) parts of Bosnia were briefly found in Serb or Croat units. Anto Babić notes that "Bosnia is mentioned on several occasions as a land of equal importance and on the same footing as all other [South Slavic] lands of this area."

=== Medieval Bosnia ===
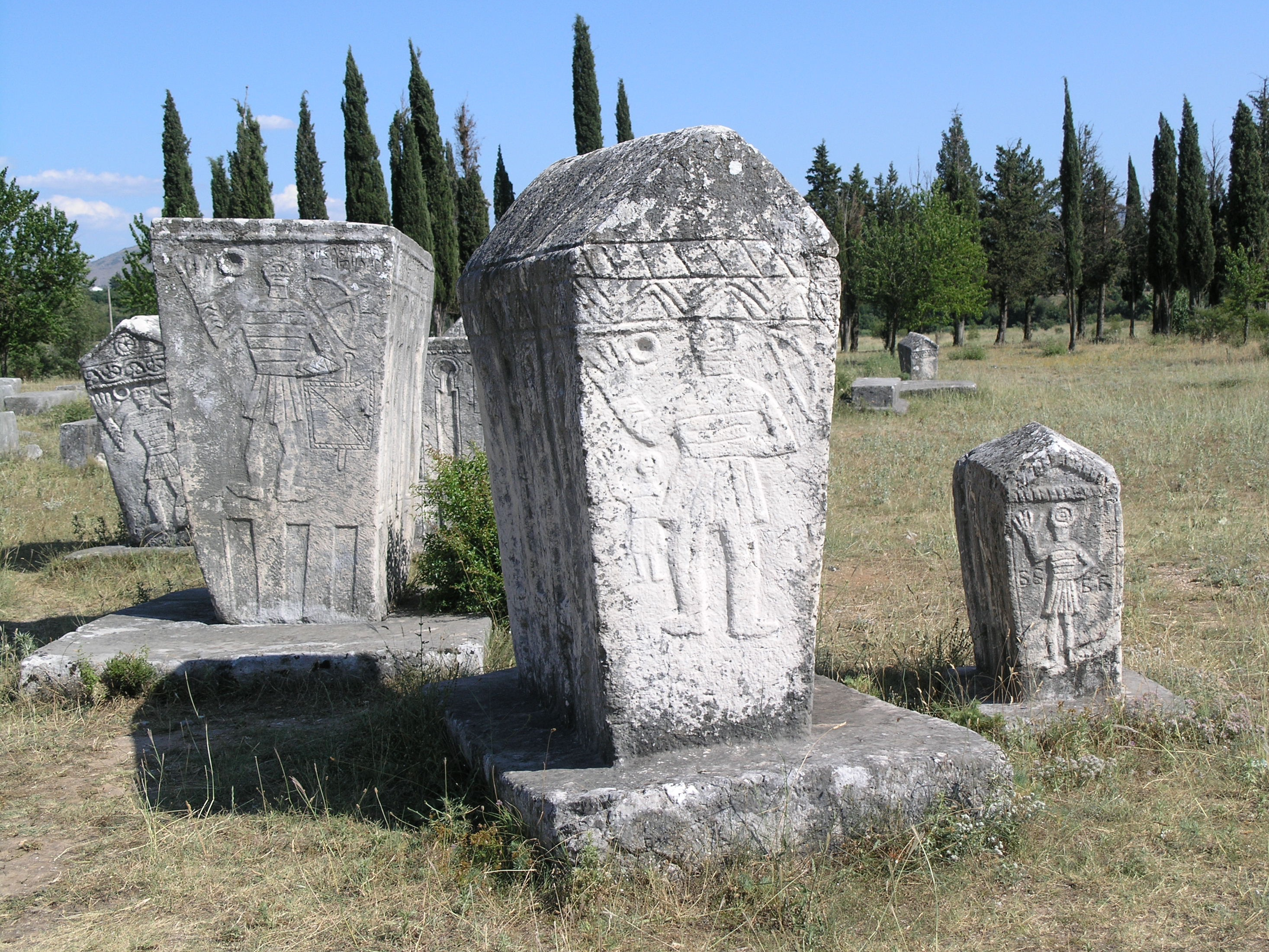
Medieval monumental tombstones (Stećci) that lie scattered across Bosnia and Herzegovina are historically associated with the Bosnian Church movement

Christian missions emanating from Rome and Constantinople had since the ninth century pushed into the Balkans and firmly established Catholicism in Croatia, while Orthodoxy came to prevail in Bulgaria, Macedonia, and eventually most of Serbia. Bosnia, lying in between, remained a no-man's land due to its mountainous terrain and poor communications. By the twelfth century, most Bosnians were probably influenced by a nominal form of Catholicism characterized by widespread illiteracy and, not least, lack of knowledge in Latin amongst Bosnian clergymen. Around this period, Bosnian independence from Hungarian overlordship was effected during the reign (1180–1204) of Kulin Ban whose rule marked the start of a religiopolitical controversy involving the native Bosnian Church. The Hungarians, frustrated by Bosnia's assertion of independence, successfully denigrated its patchy Christianity as heresy; in turn rendering a pretext to reassert their authority in Bosnia. Hungarian efforts to gain the loyalty and cooperation of the Bosnians by attempting to establish religious jurisdiction over Bosnia failed however, inciting the Hungarians to persuade the papacy to declare a crusade: finally invading Bosnia and warring there between 1235 and 1241. Experiencing various gradual successes against stubborn Bosnian resistance, the Hungarians eventually withdrew weakened by a Mongol attack on Hungary. On the request of the Hungarians, Bosnia was subordinated to a Hungarian archbishop by the pope, and though rejected by the Bosnians, the Hungarian-appointed bishop was driven out of Bosnia. The Bosnians, rejecting ties with international Catholicism came to consolidate their independent church, known as the Bosnian Church, condemned as heretical by both the Roman Catholic and Eastern Orthodox churches. Though scholars have traditionally claimed the church to be of a dualist, or neo-Manichaean or Bogomil nature (characterized by the rejection of an omnipotent God, the Trinity, church buildings, the cross, the cult of saints, and religious art), some, such as John Fine, have stressed domestic evidence indicating the retention of basic Catholic theology throughout the Middle Ages. Most scholars agree that adherents of the church referred to themselves by several names; dobri Bošnjani or Bošnjani ("good Bosnians" or simply "Bosnians"), Krstjani (Christians), dobri mužje (good men), dobri ljudi (good people) and boni homines (following the example of a dualist group in Italy). Catholic sources refer to them as patarini (patarenes), while the Serbs called them Babuni (after Babuna Mountain), the Serb term for Bogomils. The Ottomans referred to them as kristianlar while the Orthodox and Catholics were called gebir or kafir, meaning "unbeliever".

The Bosnian state was significantly strengthened under the rule (ca. 1318–1353) of Ban Stephen II of Bosnia who patched up Bosnia's relations with the Hungarian kingdom and expanded the Bosnian state, in turn incorporating Catholic and Orthodox domains to the west and south; the latter following the conquer of Zahumlje (roughly modern-day Herzegovina) from the Serbian Nemanjić dynasty. In the 1340s, Franciscan missions were launched against alleged "heresy" in Bosnia; before this, there had been no Catholics – or at least no Catholic clergy or organization – in Bosnia proper for nearly a century. By the year 1347, Stephen II was the first Bosnian ruler to accept Catholicism, which from then on came to be – at least nominally – the religion of all of Bosnia's medieval rulers, except for possibly Stephen Ostoja of Bosnia (1398–1404, 1409–18) who continued to maintain close relations with the Bosnian Church. The Bosnian nobility would subsequently often undertake nominal oaths to quell "heretical movements" – in reality, however, the Bosnian state was characterized by a religious plurality and tolerance up until the Ottoman invasion of Bosnia in 1463.

By the 1370s, the Banate of Bosnia had evolved into the powerful Kingdom of Bosnia following the coronation of Tvrtko I of Bosnia as the first Bosnian king in 1377, further expanding into neighbouring Serb and Croat dominions. However, even with the emergence of a kingdom, no concrete Bosnian identity emerged; religious plurality, independent-minded nobility, and a rugged, mountainous terrain precluded cultural and political unity. As Noel Malcolm stated: "All that one can sensibly say about the ethnic identity of the Bosnians is this: they were the Slavs who lived in Bosnia."

=== Ottoman Empire ===
After the Ottoman conquest of Bosnia and Herzegovina, the population was subjected to the process of Islamisation. The mass Islamisation didn't occur in the first years of the conquest, but in the 1480s in central Bosnia, and in other regions even later as the Ottoman administration stabilised. The full intensity of conversions occurred in the 16th century. After that, the numbers of conversions stagnated. The Western reporters of the 16th and 17th centuries spoke of the Muslim absolute majority in Bosnia and a relative majority in Herzegovina. The slowdown was also due to the cessation of only declarative conversion, as the conversions became the full initiation in the Islamic religion, which could last for several months. Reports from the 17th and 18th centuries, and 18th-century chronicles, reported only individual conversions and very seldom group conversions.

At first, this Islamisation was mostly nominal. In reality, it was an attempt at reconciling the two faiths. It was a lengthy, halting progress towards the final abandonment of their beliefs. For centuries, they were not considered full-fledged Muslims, and they even paid taxes like Christians. This process of Islamisation was not yet finished in the 17th century, as is witnessed by Paul Rycaut in 1670: "But those of this Sect who strangely mix Christianity and Mahometanism [...] The Potures [Muslims] of Bosna are of this Sect, but pay taxes as Christians do; they abhor Images and the sign of the Cross; they circumcise, bringing the Authority of Christ's example for it."

The ethnic recomposition started to occur some time before and simultaneously with the process of Islamisation. The multiethnic structure of the Islamicised Slavic population in Bosnia and Herzegovina is evident from the linguistic changes as the southeastern dialects of Serbo-Croatian language started to push out the northwestern ones.

Additionally, the Ottoman rule affected the ethnic and religious makeup of Bosnia and Herzegovina. A large number of Bosnian Catholics retreated to the still unconquered Catholic regions of Croatia, Dalmatia, and Slavonia, at the time controlled by the Republic of Venice and the Habsburg Monarchy, respectively. To fill depopulated areas in the northern and western Eyalet of Bosnia, the Ottomans encouraged the migration of large numbers of hardy, skilled settlers from Serbia and Herzegovina. Many of these settlers were Latin-speaking Vlachs that would come to adopt Slavic speech. Most of them were members of the Eastern Orthodox Church. Before the Ottoman conquest, that church had very few members in the Bosnian lands outside Herzegovina and the eastern strip of the Drina valley; there is no definite evidence of any Orthodox church buildings in central, northern, or western Bosnia before 1463. With time, most of the Vlach population adopted a Serb identity.

The majority of the converts adopted Islam through a regular conversion process. Generally, historians agree that the Islamization of the Bosnian population was not the result of violent methods of conversion but was, for the most part, peaceful and voluntary. Drawing on the work of Bosnian scholar Adem Handžić who showed that not only old-stock Bosnians contributed to the Islamic conversions but also the settled Vlachs, Srećko Matko Džaja argues that while their number was lower than that of the native Bosnians it was still high enough to call into question the well-known thesis of a perfect continuity of the emerging Bosnian Muslim population with a supposed medieval Bosnian "Bogomil" past. Dzaja however stops short of offering any quantitative data as to the Vlach admixture.

The early converts through the devshirme system in the first decades after the Ottoman conquest were the sons of the Bosnian medieval nobility. However, as the Ottoman frontier moved north and west and the privileges of the Vlachs were abolished, they, too, were subjected to the devshirme. The regular converts, however, had a much greater share in the total Bosnian Muslim population.

Ottoman records show that on many occasions, the devshirme practice was voluntary in Bosnia and Herzegovina. For example, the 1603–4 levies from Bosnia and Albania imply that such youths and their families attempted to include themselves amongst those selected. Of the groups sent from Bosnia, unusually, 410 children were Muslims, and only 82 were Christians. This was due to the so-called "special permission" granted in response to the request by Mehmed II, which made Bosnia the only area from which Muslim boys were taken. These children were called "poturoğulları" (Bosnian Muslim boys conscripted for the janissary army). They were taken only into service under bostancıbaşı, in the palace gardens.

Slovene observer Benedikt Kuripečič compiled the first reports of the religious communities in the 1530s. According to the records for 1528 and 1529, there were a total of 42,319 Christian and 26,666 Muslim households in the sanjaks (Ottoman administrative units) of Bosnia, Zvornik and Herzegovina. In a 1624 report on Bosnia (excluding Herzegovina) by Peter Masarechi, an early-seventeenth-century apostolic visitor of the Catholic Church to Bosnia, the population figures are given as 450,000 Muslims, 150,000 Catholics and 75,000 Orthodox Christians.

Demographically, the Bosnian Muslims were impacted by epidemics from the mid-17th century, and especially during the 18th century. The Muslim population was more affected than the rest, as they lived densely in towns and villages, unlike the rural Christians. The demographic blow was also caused by the Great Turkish War (1683–1699) and wars on the Persian and Russian fronts in the 18th century. However, these demographic losses were compensated by Muslim refugees during the Great Turkish War, who arrived from Hungary, Syrmia, Slavonia, Croatia and Dalmatia. Some 130,000 Muslims left the mentioned regions to settle in Bosnia and Herzegovina. These included people who arrived there from Bosnia and Herzegovina during the Ottoman conquest, but also native converts from those regions. Additionally, around 2,200 Muslims settled from Herceg-Novi in present-day Montenegro to the areas of Konjic, Rogatica and Sarajevo after Herceg Novi was taken by the Venetians in 1687. Thanks to these refugees, the Bosnian Muslims remained an absolute majority until the second half of the 18th century.

Estimate on the number of Muslims and non-Muslims in the Eyalet of Bosnia
Year	Muslims	%	Non-Muslims	%	Total
1663	400,000	51.95%	370,000	48.05%	770,000
1692	450,000	55.60%	359,225	44.40%	809,225
1696	450,000	56.44%	347,225	43.56%	797,225
1713	375,000	56.18%	292,500	43.82%	667,500
1717	353,927	54.63%	294,000	45.37%	647,927
1730	329,003	56.61%	252,000	43.39%	581,003
1735	219,336	40.37%	324,000	59.63%	543,336
1740	214,949	40.45%	317,200	59.55%	532,149
1763	255,000	42.67%	342,725	57.33%	597,725
1775	298,200	43.29%	390,450	56.71%	688,650
1780	316,200	41.53%	445,000	58.47%	761,200
1783	327,000	40.75%	480,000	59.25%	807,000
1788	345,000	40.88%	499,275	59.12%	844,275
1790	352,200	46.82%	400,000	53.18%	752,200
1792	352,200	46.82%	455,000	53.18%	752,200
1794	366,600	44.23%	462,020	55.77%	828,620
1803	400,000	43.63%	516,860	56.37%	916,860

There were also immigrations of Slavic Muslims from present-day Serbia. These Slavic Muslims were descendants of converts from the local Slavic population as well as immigrants from the East and other ethnic groups. These immigrations begun after the Austro-Turkish War (1735–1739). Also, there was a larger number of Bosnian Muslim immigrants to Serbia in 1741. The second wave of emigration of Slavic Muslims from Serbia occurred in 1788. A large influx of Muslim refugees from Serbia arrived to Bosnia and Herzegovina during the 1860s, a trend which continued until the 1880s. Serbia completely lost its Muslim population by 1867, while the emigration from southeastern Serbia ended in 1882. These were the result of efforts of the Serbian authorities to remove their Muslim population. Between 1867 and 1868, around 30,000 Muslims moved from Serbia to Bosnia and Herzegovina. This last wave of immigrants settled the areas in and around of Bijeljina, Janja, Kozluk, Zvornik, Srebrenica, Vlasenica, Brčko, Kladanj, Tuzla and Gračanica. They also established new setllements: Brezovačko Polje, Šamac and Orašje. Also, after the Congress of Berlin in 1878, when former Ottoman territory was awarded to Montenegro, some 20,000 Slavic Muslims and Albanians emigrated, half of whom went to Bosnia and Herzegovina and Novi Pazar. These Montenegrin Muslims were mostly from the towns of Nikšić and Kolašin.

Muslims in the Ottoman Bosnia and Herzegovina per census
Year	Persons	%	Total population
1851	402,500	37.34%	1,077,956
1870	722,188	47.82%	1,510,307

During the Ottoman Empire, Bosnian Muslims didn't express their collective identity to one another through Bosniak identity. At the time, the Bosnian population differentiated between the Turks, which included the Muslims in general, and the Christians (hrišćani for the Eastern Orthodox Christians and kršćani for the Catholics), also called the Vlachs. This was a key distinction among the Bosnian population at the time. In the late Ottoman period, Bosnian Muslim public discourse sometimes invoked Bosnia as a distinct historical and political land. The clearest example is Mehmed Šakir Kurtćehajić, editor of Sarajevski cvjetnik, whose writing defended Bosnia against Serbian and Croatian national claims and presented Bosnian Muslims within a Bosnian historical-political framework. The Bosnian Muslim population lacked any cultural tradition with medieval Bosnia.

Several authors and traditions show a continuing attachment to Bosnia as a land of origin, language and communal belonging, although this should not be equated with modern nationalism. The seventeenth-century writer Muhamed Hevaji Uskufi used the designation Bosnevi and compiled a Bosnian–Turkish dictionary in 1631, while Hasan Kafi Pruščak, whose full scholarly name included al-Bosnevi, was likewise identified through a Bosnian nisba. Other Ottoman Bosnian Muslim figures, such as Mula Mustafa Bašeskija, were rooted in Bosnian urban and provincial settings, while Bosniak epic poetry repeatedly represented Bosnia as homeland, region and political whole.

The Ottoman military reform efforts, which called for further expansion of the centrally controlled army (nizam), new taxes and more Ottoman bureaucracy, would have important consequences in Bosnia and Herzegovina. These reforms weakened the special status and privileges of the Bosnian aristocracy, while the formation of a modern army endangered the privileges of the Bosnian Muslim military men and local lords, who demanded greater independence from Constantinople. Barbara Jelavich states: "The Muslims of Bosnia and Herzegovina [...] were becoming increasingly disillusioned with the Ottoman government. The centralising reforms cut directly into their privileges and seemed to offer no compensating benefits. [...]"

=== Austria-Hungary ===
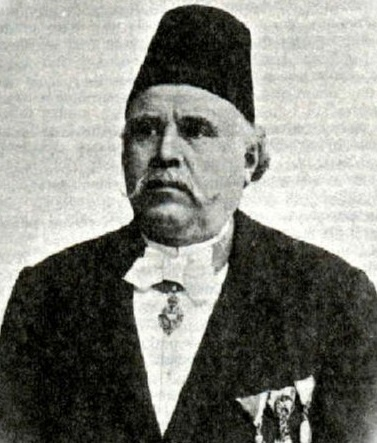
Mehmed Kapetanović was the leading proponent of the Bosniak identity

The Austro-Hungarian administration of the joint Finance Minister Béni Kállay promoted the idea of a non-confessional unitary "Bosniak" identity that would encompass all inhabitants (more akin to "Bosnism"), going even as far as prohibiting Bosnian cultural associations from using the terms "Serb" and "Croat" in their names in the 1880s. In 1883, they officially called the vernacular language "Bosnian". The policy placed its hopes mainly in the Catholic community (which was not yet as deeply entrenched in Croat nationalism as the Orthodox were in the Serb one) and the Muslim community (which sought to distance itself from the Ottoman Empire). In reality, only a small circle of Muslim notables at the time favoured such a unitary nation. The movement's foremost proponent was Mehmed Kapetanović. Although it failed, the Bosniak ideology promoted by the Austrian-Hungarian authorities laid the foundation for the modern Bosniak identity. By emphasising the pre-Ottoman past, it created a founding myth —a theory of the massive conversion of medieval Bogumils to Islam upon the Ottoman conquest —offering a historical continuity and rationale for their presence in Europe. Before this, Bosnian Muslims lacked any cultural ties to medieval Bosnia.

The idea of continuity between the Bosnian Muslims and the Bosnian medieval period through the supposed conversion of the Bosnian Muslim nobility from Bogomilism was first put forth by Nicholas of Modruš, a papal legate, in the late 15th century. The idea survived in literary circles and was used by the forgers of the 16th and 17th centuries for the needs of certain upstart individuals. In the end, the idea was presented to the Bosnian Muslims. The literary work of the Bosnian Muslims lacks any tradition of identity with the medieval Bosnian period, indicating the discontinuity of Bosnian Muslim society with medieval Bosnian society.

Stephan Burián von Rajecz became the Finance Minister in 1903, marking a turning point in Austrian-Hungarian national policy towards Bosnia and Herzegovina. They abandoned the failed Bosniak project and promoted a communitarian identity for the various groups within Bosnia and Herzegovina. In 1907, they changed the vernacular language's name to Serbo-Croatian. The Serbo-Croatian Muslims were referred to as "Mohammedans" until the early 1900s, when the term "Muslims" gained wider acceptance. The term gained official recognition during the 1910 census.

While the communitarisation of the socio-political life of the Eastern Orthodox and the Catholic communities was harmonised with Serb and Croat nationalist sentiment, such a process was absent in the Muslim community. In the Austrian-Hungarian period and after it, the majority of Bosnian Muslims lacked national identity, while those who did often changed it through their lifetime. Historian Robert Donia wrote that "the declarations [of nationality] were mostly tactical and political; some Muslims changed from one camp to the other on several occasions. Simply stated, a separate Muslim identity was too advanced to be easily renounced by any significant number of Bosnian Muslims".

Despite the low school attendance, the Muslim community produced a small portion of intelligentsia. The intelligentsia clashed with traditional Muslim elites, urging them to abandon Ottoman nostalgia and embrace European modernity. The intellectuals refused a national identity limited to Bosnian Muslims, instead opting to join the two existing camps: the Serbian or the Croatian. The division between the two camps further weakened the Muslim intelligentsia. According to Donia, "more Muslims declared themselves as Croats prior to the turn of the [twentieth] century. They tended to be young intellectuals schooled in Zagreb, Vienna, or elsewhere in the Monarchy. After 1900, more declared themselves Serbs, probably drawn by the magnetic military and political successes of independent Serbia".

The traditional representatives of the Bosnian Muslims were indifferent towards the idea of a national identity or deeply reserved about being included in one. During a parliamentary discussion about the name of the vernacular language, the Bosnian Muslim representative Derviš Bey Miralem stated that:

I am convinced that the large majority of our people is indifferent to the matter, as they feel themselves to be simply Muslims, and for this reason alone, this subject should not be decided by [Muslim] members of parliament whose electors feel no need to think about or decide on this question. My stance, to tell the truth, is that this question must be resolved by the Serbs and Croats...

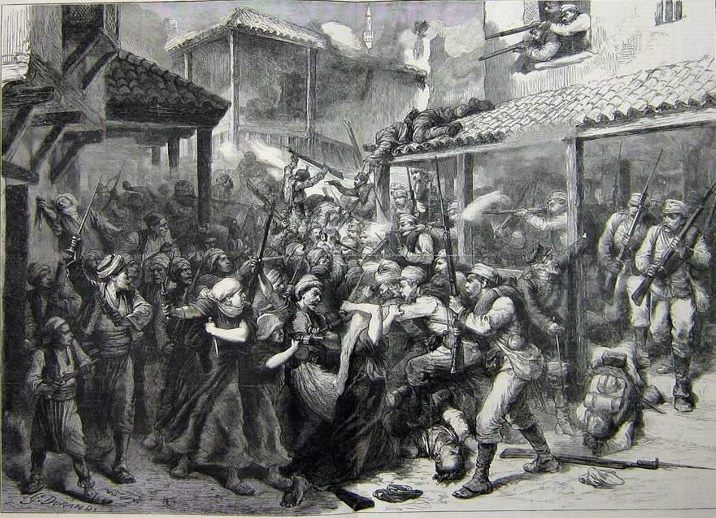
Illustration of resistance during the siege of Sarajevo in 1878 against the Austro-Hungarian troops.

In 1875, a revolt by Orthodox Serb peasants in Herzegovina sparked a significant geopolitical shift in the Balkans. By 1876, Serbia and Montenegro used the uprising as a pretext to declare war on the Ottoman Empire, with the Russian Empire following suit a year later. The subsequent Ottoman defeat led to the Congress of Berlin in 1878, which reshaped the political landscape of the region. Serbia and Montenegro gained official independence and expanded their territories, while Bulgaria achieved de facto independence, marking a crucial step in the formation of Balkan nation-states.

Bosnia, however, transitioned from one imperial rule to another. Except for the Sanjak of Novi Pazar, the Bosnian Vilayet was placed under Austrian-Hungarian military occupation while formally remaining under Ottoman sovereignty. The Novi Pazar Agreement, signed in 1879 between the Austro-Hungarian and Ottoman Empires, reaffirmed Ottoman sovereignty in principle while outlining the framework for Austro-Hungarian administration. The agreement also secured certain religious rights for Muslims in the newly designated province of Bosnia and Herzegovina, allowing them to maintain ties with Ottoman religious authorities, fly Ottoman flags at mosques during religious holidays, and hold khutbas (Friday sermons) in the name of the Sultan.

Austrian-Hungarian troops initially encountered armed resistance from segments of the Muslim population upon entering the province. While Sarajevo fell within a few days, it took three months for Austrian-Hungarian forces to establish full control over Bosnia and Herzegovina. This resistance stemmed largely from Muslim opposition to becoming subjects of a non-Muslim power. However, the secular and religious Muslim elites generally viewed Austro-Hungarian rule as the lesser of two evils and prioritised the protection of their material interests. Consequently, they opposed armed resistance and quickly pledged allegiance to the new imperial authority. Nonetheless, many among them harboured a deep nostalgia for the Ottoman Empire and even secretly hoped for its return.

Rather than armed revolt, emigration became the primary means through which some Bosnian Muslims expressed their refusal to submit to Austro-Hungarian rule. This emigration continued throughout the Austro-Hungarian period, intensifying during moments of political tension, particularly following the formal annexation of Bosnia and Herzegovina in 1908, which ended the façade of Ottoman sovereignty. Austro-Hungarian records document approximately 65,000 departures to the Ottoman Empire between 1878 and 1914, suggesting that higher estimates of 100,000 to 150,000 emigrants are likely exaggerated.

The issue of emigration sparked the first major doctrinal debate of the post-Ottoman era. Some members of the ulama (Islamic scholars) framed emigration as hijra (religious migration) and, therefore, a religious duty. This interpretation was reinforced by a fatwa issued in 1887 by the Şeyh-ül-Islam of Istanbul, the highest religious authority in the Ottoman Empire. However, several Bosnian ulama rejected this view, arguing that submission to a non-Muslim power was permissible. In 1884, the Mufti of Tuzla, Teufik Azapagić, asserted that Bosnia and Herzegovina had not become part of dar al-kufr (the realm of unbelief) but remained within dar al-Islam (the realm of Islam), as Muslims were still able to practice their religion freely. According to Azapagić, Bosnian Muslims were therefore not obligated to emigrate to Ottoman territory.

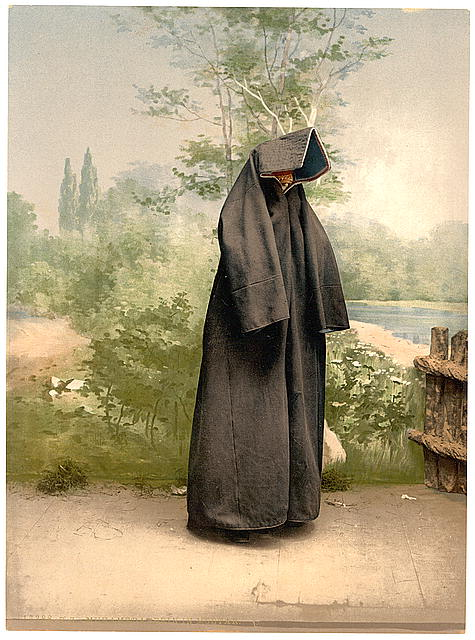
Muslim woman from Mostar during Austria-Hungary

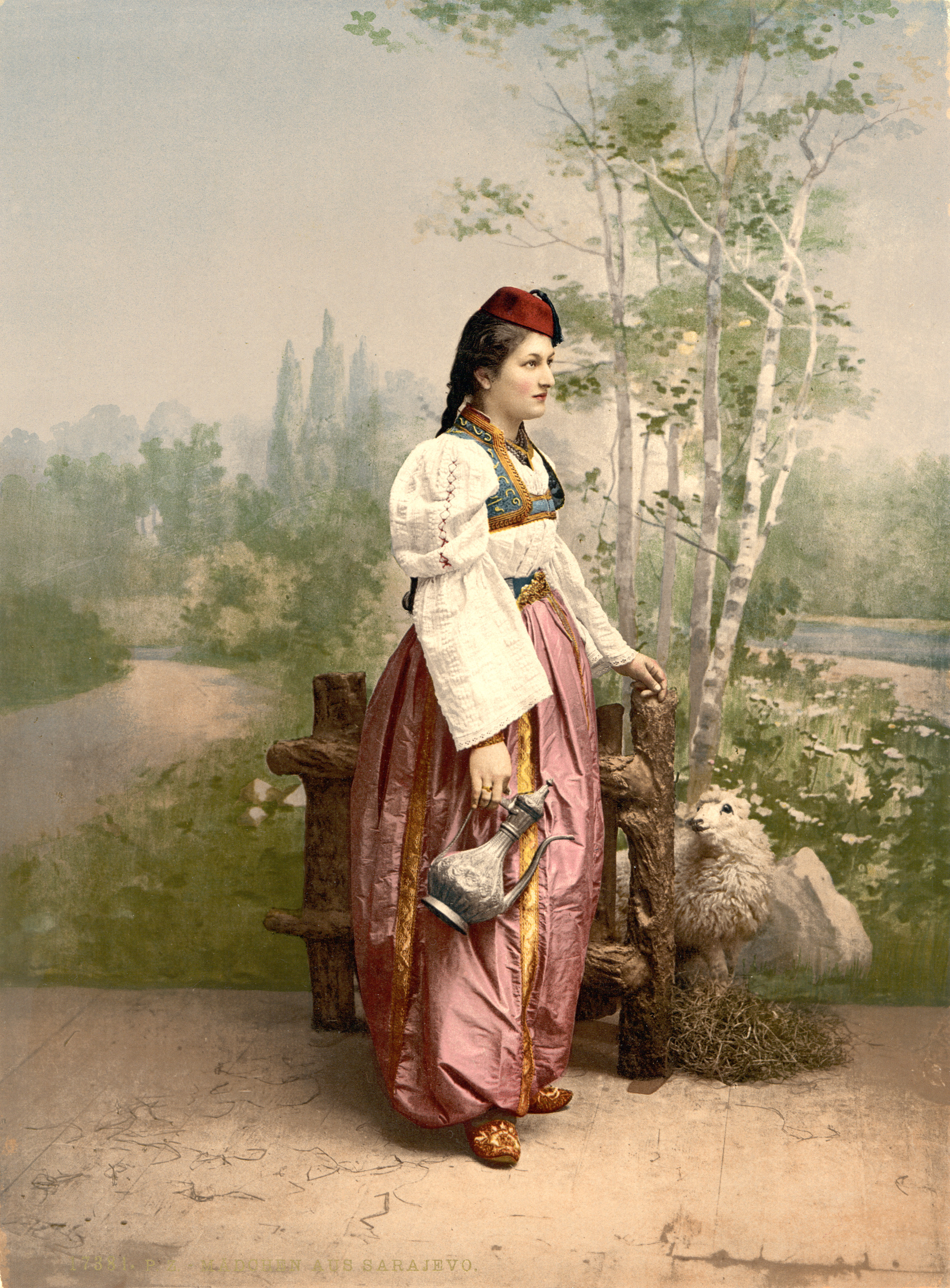
Young Bosniak woman from Sarajevo during Austria-Hungary

During the 20th century, Bosnian Muslims founded several cultural and welfare associations to promote and preserve their cultural identity. The most prominent associations were Gajret, Merhamet, Narodna Uzdanica and later Preporod. The Bosnian Muslim intelligentsia also gathered around the magazine Bosnia in the 1860s to promote the idea of a unified Bosniak nation. This Bosniak group would remain active for several decades, with the continuity of ideas and the use of the Bosniak name. From 1891 until 1910, they published a Latin-script magazine titled Bošnjak (Bosniak), which promoted the concept of Bosniakism (Bošnjaštvo) and openness toward European culture. Since that time the Bosniaks adopted European culture under the broader influence of the Habsburg Monarchy. At the same time they kept the peculiar characteristics of their Bosnian Islamic lifestyle. These initial, but important initiatives were followed by a new magazine named Behar whose founders were Safvet-beg Bašagić (1870–1934), Edhem Mulabdić (1862–1954) and Osman Nuri Hadžić (1869–1937).

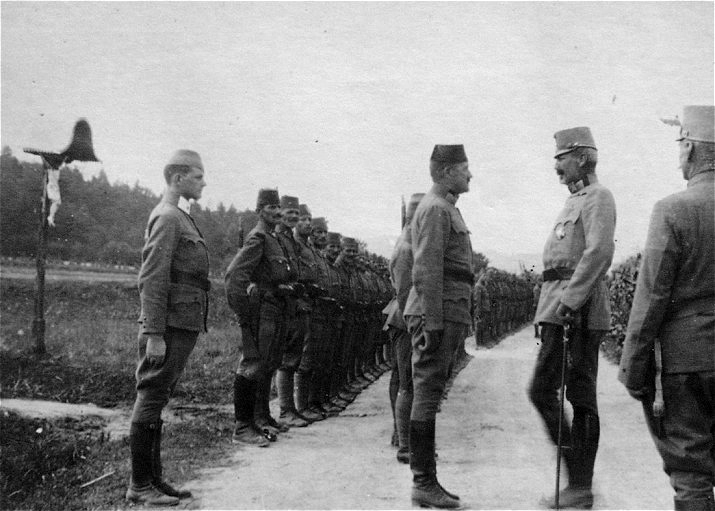
Bosniaks formed 31%–50% of Bosnian-Herzegovinian Infantry of the Austro-Hungarian Army. BHI was commended for their bravery in service of the Austrian emperor in WWI, winning more medals than any other unit.

After the occupation of Bosnia and Herzegovina in 1878, the Austrian administration of Benjamin Kallay, the Austro-Hungarian governor of Bosnia and Herzegovina, officially endorsed "Bosniakhood" as the basis of a multi-confessional Bosnian nation that would include Christians as well as Muslims. The policy attempted to isolate Bosnia and Herzegovina from its neighbours (Orthodox Serbia and Catholic Croatia, but also the Muslims of the Ottoman Empire) and to negate the concepts of Serbian and Croatian nationhood which had already begun to take ground among the country's Orthodox and Catholic communities, respectively. The notion of Bosnian nationhood, however, was rejected even by Bosnian Muslims and fiercely opposed by Serb and Croat nationalists who were instead seeking to claim Bosnian Muslims as their own, a move that was rejected by most of them.

After Kallay died in 1903, the official policy slowly drifted towards accepting the three-ethnic reality of Bosnia and Herzegovina. Ultimately, the failure of Austro-Hungarian ambitions to nurture a Bosniak identity amongst the Catholic and Orthodox led to almost exclusively Bosnian Muslims adhering to it, with 'Bosniakhood' consequently adopted as a Bosnian Muslim ethnic ideology by nationalist figures.

In November 1881, upon introducing the Bosnian-Herzegovinian Infantry, the Austro-Hungarian government passed a Military Law (Wehrgesetz) imposing an obligation upon all Bosnian Muslims to serve in the Imperial Army, which led to widespread riots in December 1881 and throughout 1882; the Austrians appealed to the Mufti of Sarajevo, Mustafa Hilmi Hadžiomerović (born 1816) and he soon issued a Fatwa "calling on the Bosniaks to obey military Law." Other important Muslim community leaders such as Mehmed-beg Kapetanović Ljubušak, later Mayor of Sarajevo, also appealed to young Muslim men to serve in the Habsburg military.

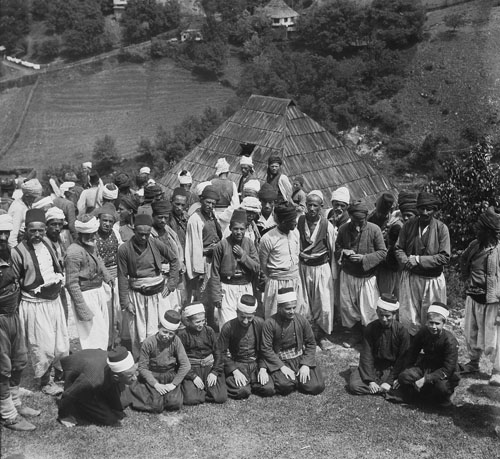
Bosniaks c. 1906, by Rudolf Bruner-Dvořák

In 1903, the Gajret cultural society was established; it promoted Serb identity among the Slavic Muslims of Austria-Hungary (today's Bosnia and Herzegovina) and viewed that the Muslims were Serbs lacking ethnic consciousness. The view that Muslims were Serbs is probably the oldest of three ethnic theories among the Bosnian Muslims themselves. At the outbreak of World War I, Bosnian Muslims were conscripted to serve in the Austro-Hungarian army, some chose to desert rather than fight against fellow Slavs, whilst some Bosniaks attacked Bosnian Serbs in apparent anger after the assassination of Archduke Franz Ferdinand. Austro-Hungarian authorities in Bosnia and Herzegovina imprisoned and extradited approximately 5,500 prominent Serbs, 700–2,200 of whom died in prison. 460 Serbs were sentenced to death and a predominantly Bosniak special militia known as the Schutzkorps was established and carried out the persecution of Serbs. Neven Anđelić writes One can only guess what kind of feeling was dominant in Bosnia at the time. Both animosity and tolerance existed at the same time.

=== Yugoslavia ===
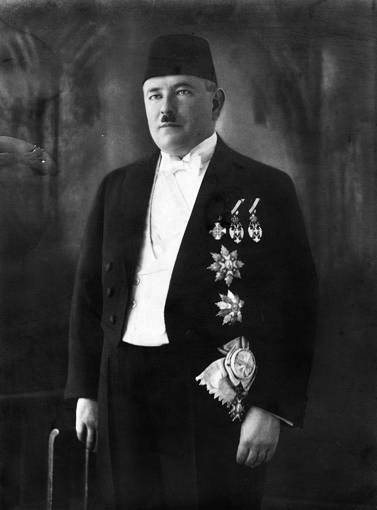
Mehmed Spaho was one of the most important members of the Bosnian Muslim community during the Kingdom of Serbs, Croats and Slovenes (Yugoslavia).

After World War I, the Kingdom of Serbs, Croats and Slovenes (later known as the Kingdom of Yugoslavia) was formed. In it, Bosnian Muslims alongside Macedonians and Montenegrins were not acknowledged as a distinct ethnic group. However; the first provisional cabinet included a Muslim.

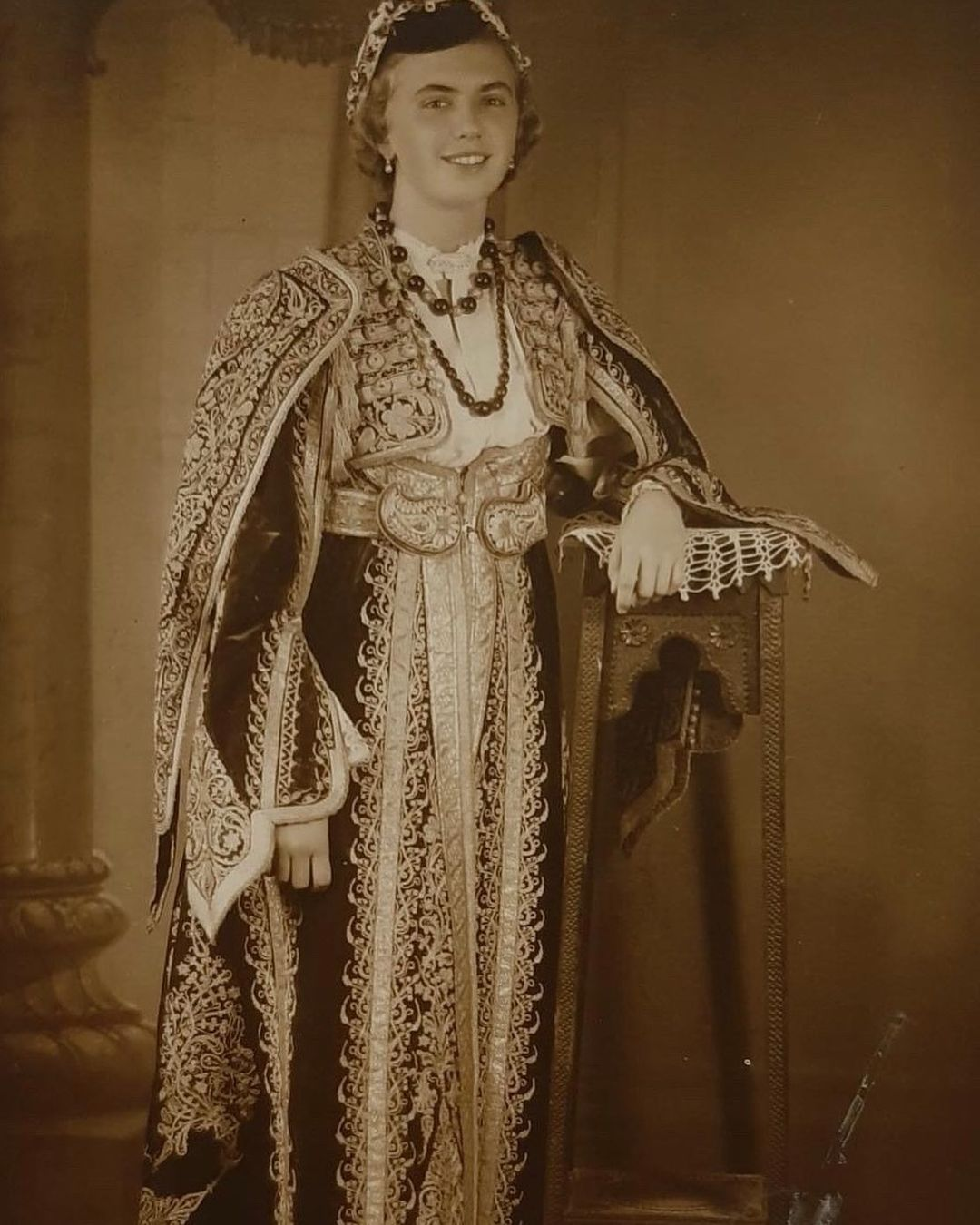
Young Bosniak woman from Tuzla in urban costume during the 1930s

Politically, Bosnia and Herzegovina was split into four banovinas with Muslims being the minority in each. After the Cvetković-Maček Agreement 13 counties of Bosnia and Herzegovina were incorporated into the Banovina of Croatia and 38 counties into the projected Serbian portion of Yugoslavia. In calculating the division, the Muslims were discounted altogether which prompted the Bosnian Muslims to create the Movement for the Autonomy of Bosnia-Herzegovina. Moreover, land reforms proclaimed in the February 1919 affected 66.9 per cent of the land in Bosnia and Herzegovina. Given that the old landowning was predominantly Bosnian Muslim, the land reforms were resisted. Violence against Muslims and the enforced seizure of their lands shortly ensued. Bosnian Muslims were offered compensation but it was never fully materialized. The regime sought to pay 255,000,000 dinars in compensation per a period of 40 years with an interest rate of 6%. Payments began in 1936 and were expected to be completed in 1975; however, in 1941 World War Two erupted and only 10% of the projected remittances were made.

Until 1968, the Bosnian Muslims were given no official recognition as a distinct ethnicity in the former Yugoslavia. In 1968, the Constitution of Yugoslavia was thus amended to introduce a "Muslim nationality" that would define native Slavic Serbo-Croatian speaking Muslims on the territory of the former Yugoslavia; effectively recognizing a constitutive Yugoslav nation alongside Serbs, Croats, Slovenes, Montenegrins and Macedonians. Prior to this, the great majority of Bosnian Muslims had declared either "Ethnically Undecided Muslim" or – to a lesser extent – "Undecided Yugoslav" in Yugoslav censuses as the other available options were "Serb-Muslim" and "Croat-Muslim". Albeit achieving national recognition, the novel use of "Muslim" as an ethnic rather than religious denomination was met with scepticism by leading Bosnian Muslim political figures such as Hamdija Pozderac who remarked "they are not giving us Bosnianhood, they are offering Muslimness. Let us take what they are offering, even if it is the wrong name, but we will open a process".

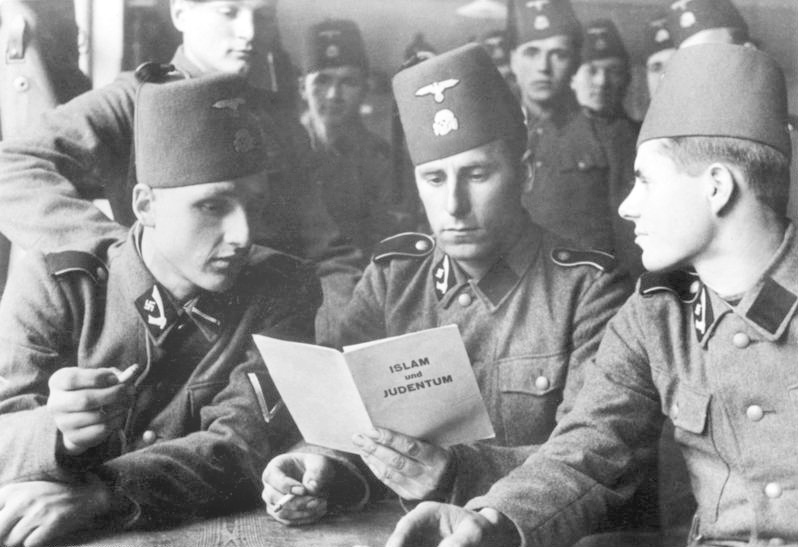
Bosnian Muslim soldiers of the SS "Handschar" reading a Nazi propaganda book, Islam und Judentum, in Nazi-occupied Southern France (Bundesarchiv, 21 June 1943)

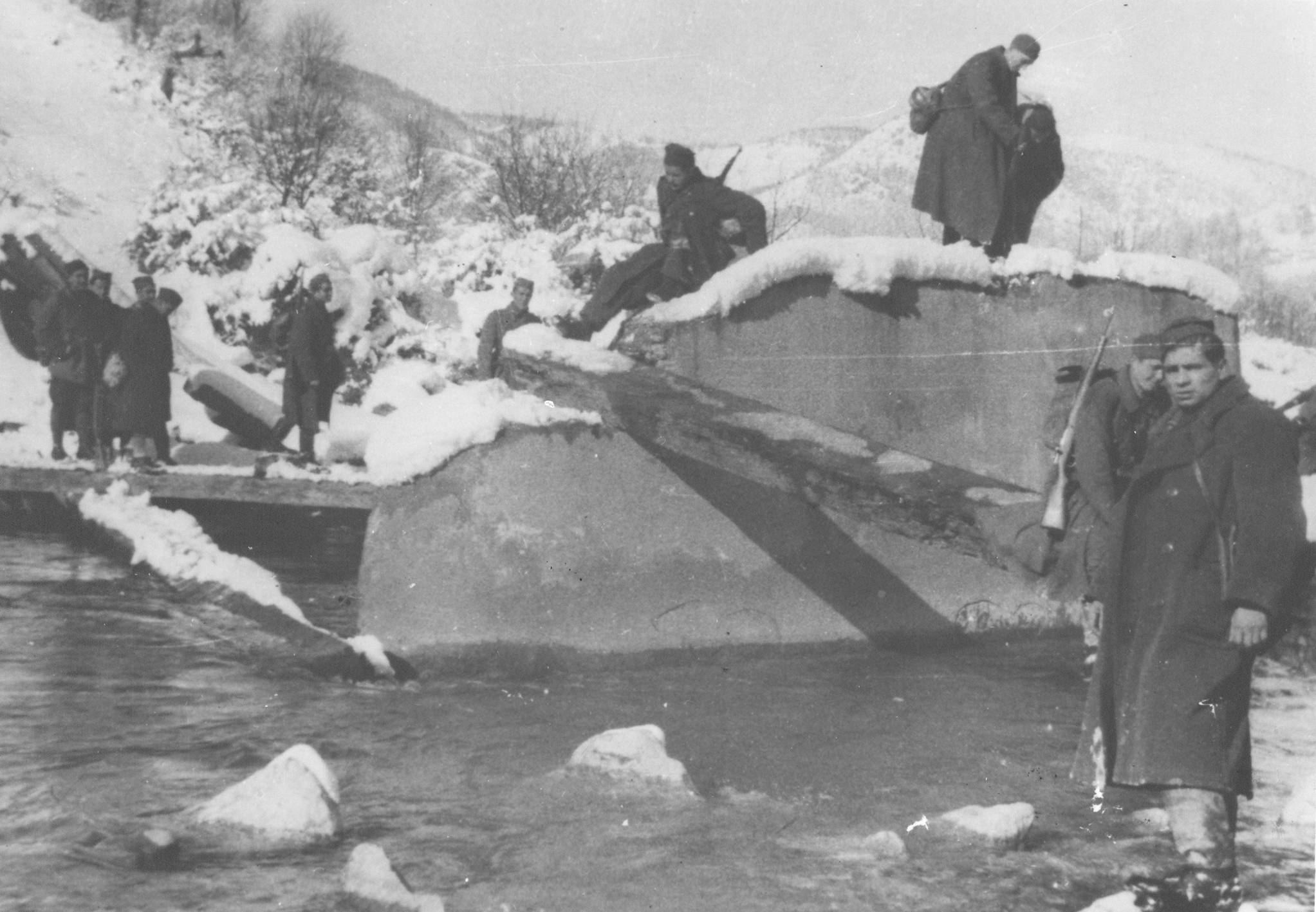
Bosnian Muslim soldiers of the 16th Muslim Brigade cross the Drinjača river during the Kugelblitz / Schneesturm operations againts Axis forces, December 1943

During World War II, Bosnia and Herzegovina was part of the Independent State of Croatia (NDH), and the majority of Bosnian Muslims considered themselves to be ethnic Croats. A large number of the Bosnian Muslim population sided with the Ustaše. Muslims composed approximately 12 per cent of the civil service and armed forces of the Independent State of Croatia. Some of them also participated in Ustaše atrocities, while Bosnian Muslims in Nazi Waffen-SS units were responsible for massacres of Serbs in northwest and eastern Bosnia, most notably in Vlasenica. At this time several massacres against Bosnian Muslims were carried out by Serb and Montenegrin Chetniks.

Some Bosnian Muslim elite and notables issued resolutions or memorandums in various cities that publicly denounced Nazi collaborationist measures, laws and violence against Serbs: Prijedor (23 September), Sarajevo (the Resolution of Sarajevo Muslims of 12 October), Mostar (21 October), Banja Luka (12 November), Bijeljina (2 December) and Tuzla (11 December). The resolutions condemned the Ustaše in Bosnia and Herzegovina, both for their mistreatment of Muslims and for their attempts at turning Muslims and Serbs against one another. One memorandum declared that since the beginning of the Ustaše regime, that Muslims dreaded the lawless activities that some Ustaše, some Croatian government authorities, and various illegal groups perpetrated against the Serbs.

Many Muslims joined the Yugoslav Partisan forces, "making it a truly multi-ethnic force". In the entirety of the war, the Yugoslav Partisans of Bosnia and Herzegovina were 23 per cent Muslim. Year 1943 marked a turning point in the attitude of Bosnian Muslims toward the Partisans, as Chetnik violence, the weakening of the NDH, encouraged a significant section of the Muslim population, and the involvement of prominent figures such as Nurija Pozderac, Vahida Maglajlić, Hasan Brkić, Avdo Humo and others. This process was reflected in the formation of Muslim Partisan units, most notably the 16th Muslim Brigade, while Hoare also notes the later influx of former members of the Green Cadres into Partisan ranks during 1944. Even so, Serb-dominated Yugoslav Partisans would often enter Bosnian Muslim villages, killing Bosnian Muslim intellectuals and other potential opponents. In February 1943, the Germans approved the 13th Waffen Mountain Division of the SS Handschar (1st Croatian) and began recruitment. It is estimated that 75,000 Muslims died in the war, although the number may have been as high as 86,000 or 6.8 per cent of their pre-war population.

In the 1948 census, Bosnia and Herzegovina's Muslims had three options in the census: "Serb-Muslim", "Croat-Muslim", and "ethnically undeclared Muslim". In the 1953 census the category "Yugoslav, ethnically undeclared" was introduced and the overwhelming majority of those who declared themselves as such were Muslims. Aleksandar Ranković and other Serb communist members opposed the recognition of Bosnian Muslim nationality. Muslim members of the communist party continued in their efforts to get Tito to support their position for recognition. The Bosnian Muslims were recognised as an ethnic group in 1961, and could identify as such at the 1961 census. However, they were not recognised as a nationality yet and in 1964 the Fourth Congress of the Bosnian Party assured the Bosnian Muslims the right to self-determination. On that occasion, one of the leading communist leaders, Rodoljub Čolaković, stated that "our Muslim brothers" were equal with Serbs and Croats and that they would not be "forced to declare themselves as Serbs and Croats." He guaranteed them "full freedom in their national determination" Following the downfall of Ranković, Tito changed his view and stated that recognition of Muslims and their national identity should occur. In 1968 the move was protested in the Serb republic and by Serb nationalists such as Dobrica Ćosić. In 1971, the Muslims were fully recognized as a nationality and in the census the option "Muslims by nationality" was added.

Muslims in SFR Yugoslavia
Republic	1971	1981	1991
Bosnia and Herzegovina	1,482,430 (39.6%)	1,630,033 (39.5%)	1,902,956 (43.5%)
Serbia	154,364 (1.8%)	215,166 (2.3%)	246,411 (2.5%)
Montenegro	70,236 (13.3%)	78,080 (13.4%)	89,614 (14.6%)
Croatia	18,457 (0.4%)	23,740 (0.5%)	43,469 (0.9%)
Macedonia	1,248 (0.1%)	39,512 (2.1%)	35,256 (1.7%)
Slovenia	3,197 (0.2%)	13,425 (0.7%)	26,867 (1.4%)
Yugoslavia	1,729,932 (8.4%)	1,999,957 (8.9%)	2,344,573 (10.0%)

=== Bosnian War ===
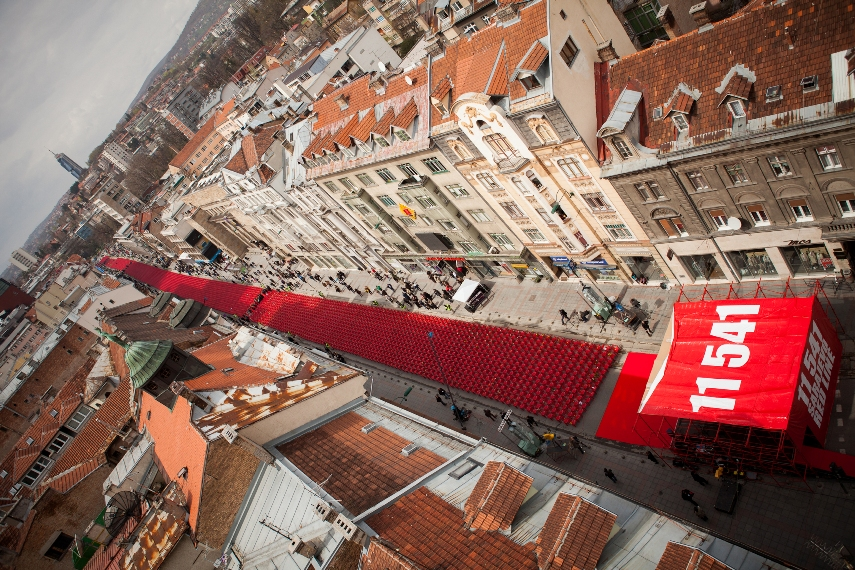
The Sarajevo Red Line, a memorial event of the siege of Sarajevo's 20th anniversary. 11,541 empty chairs symbolized 11,541 victims of the war which, according to Research and Documentation Center were killed during the siege of Sarajevo.

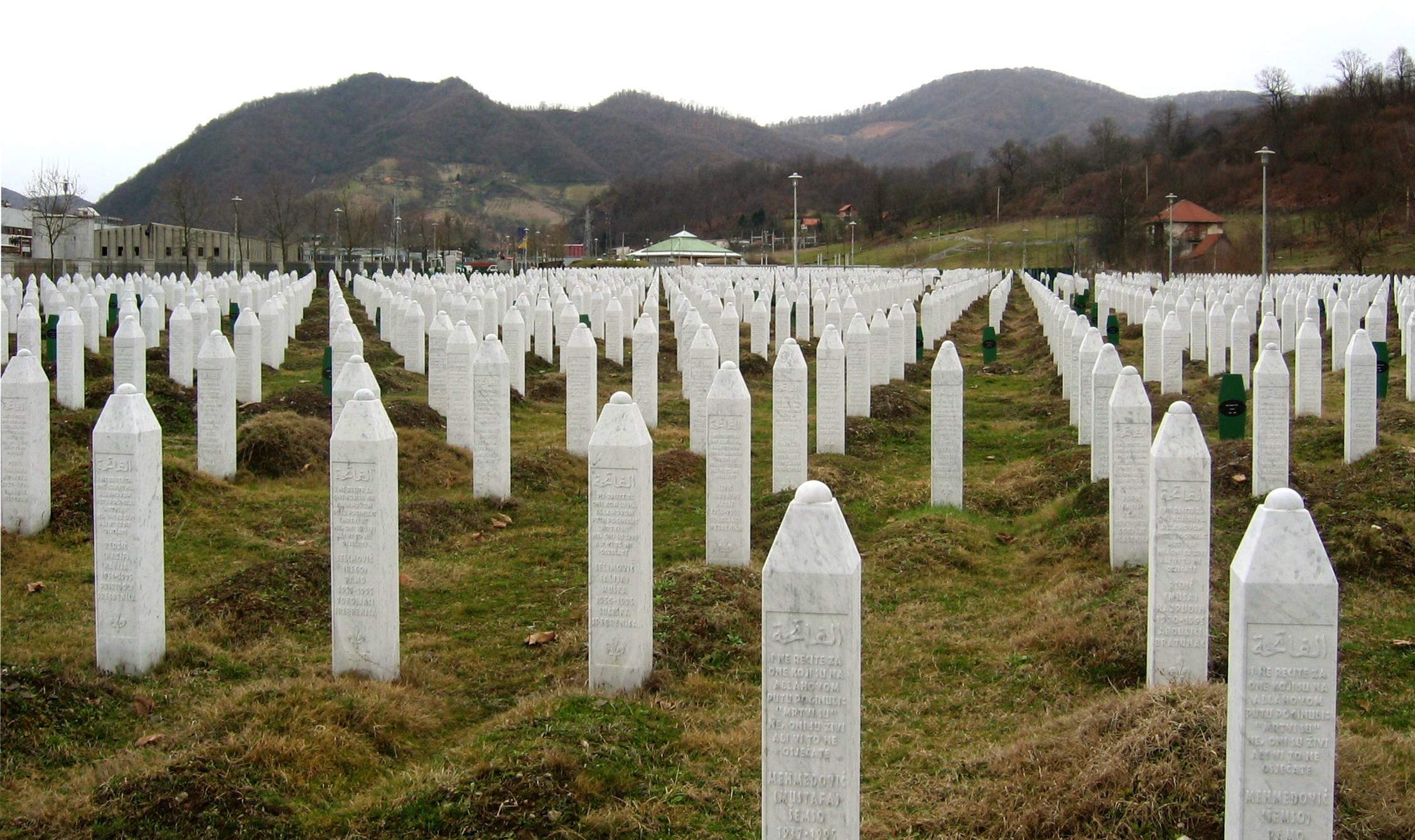
Gravestones at the Potočari genocide memorial near Srebrenica. Around 8,000+ Bosniak men and boys were killed by the units of the Army of the Republika Srpska during the Srebrenica massacre in July 1995.

During the war, the Bosniaks were subject to ethnic cleansing and genocide. The war caused hundreds of thousands of Bosniaks to flee the nation. The war also caused many drastic demographic changes in Bosnia. Bosniaks were prevalent throughout almost all of Bosnia in 1991, a year before the war officially broke out. As a result of the war, Bosniaks in Bosnia were concentrated mostly in areas that were held by the Bosnian government during the war for independence. Today Bosniaks make up the absolute majority in Sarajevo and its canton, most of northwestern Bosnia around Bihać, as well as central Bosnia, Brčko District, Goražde, Podrinje and parts of Herzegovina.

At the outset of the Bosnian war, forces of the Army of Republika Srpska attacked the Bosnian Muslim civilian population in eastern Bosnia. Once towns and villages were securely in their hands, the Bosnian Serb forces – military, police, the paramilitaries and, sometimes, even Bosnian Serb villagers – applied the same pattern: houses and apartments were systematically ransacked or burnt down, civilians were rounded up or captured, and sometimes beaten or killed in the process. Men and women were separated, with many of the men massacred or detained in the camps. The women were kept in various detention centres where they had to live in intolerably unhygienic conditions, where they were mistreated in many ways including being raped repeatedly. Bosnian Serb soldiers or policemen would come to these detention centres, select one or more women, take them out and rape them.

The Bosnian Serbs had the upper hand due to heavier weaponry (despite less manpower) that was given to them by the Yugoslav People's Army and established control over most areas where Serbs had a relative majority but also in areas where they were a significant minority in both rural and urban regions excluding the larger towns of Sarajevo and Mostar. Bosnian Serb military and political leadership received the most accusations of war crimes by the International Criminal Tribunal for the former Yugoslavia (ICTY) many of which have been confirmed after the war in ICTY trials.

Most of the capital Sarajevo was predominantly held by the Bosniaks. In the 44 months of the siege, terror against Sarajevo residents varied in intensity, but the purpose remained the same: inflict suffering on civilians to force the Bosnian authorities to accept Bosnian Serb demands. Bosniaks accounted for roughly half of all deaths which took place during the Yugoslav Wars (approximately 65,000 of 130,000 total fatalities).

=== Modern identity ===
The Bosniak Institute located in the city of Sarajevo.

By the early 1990s, a vast majority of Bosnian Muslims identified as ethnic Muslims. According to a poll from 1990, only 1.8% of the citizens of Bosnia and Herzegovina supported the idea of a "Bosniak" national identity (by then already an essentially archaic term), while 17% considered the name to encompass all of the inhabitants of Bosnia and Herzegovina. Their main political party, the Party of Democratic Action, rejected the idea of Bosniak identity and managed to expel those who promoted it. The supporters of the Bosniak nationhood established their political party, the Muslim Bosniak Organisation, and received only 1.1% of the votes during the 1990 general election. At the 1991 census, 1,496 people identified as Muslims-Bosniaks, 1,285 as Bosniaks and 876 as Bosniaks-Muslims, totalling to 3,657 or 0.08% of the total population.

On 27 September 1993, however, after the leading political, cultural, and religious representatives of Bosnian Muslims held an assembly and at the same time when they rejected the Owen–Stoltenberg peace plan adopted the Bosniak name deciding to "return to our people their historical and national name of Bosniaks, to tie ourselves in this way for our country of Bosnia and its state-legal tradition, for our Bosnian language and all spiritual tradition of our history". The main reason for the SDA to adopt the Bosniak identity, only three years after expelling the supporters of the idea from their party ranks, was due to foreign policy considerations. One of the leading SDA figures Džemaludin Latić, the editor of the official gazette of the party, commented on the decision stating that: "In Europe, he who doesn't have a national name, doesn't have a country" and that "we must be Bosniaks, that what we are, to survive in our country". The decision to adopt the Bosniak identity was primarily influenced by the change of opinion of the former communist intellectuals such as Atif Purivatra, Alija Isaković and those who were a part of the pan-Islamists such as Rusmir Mahmutćehajić (who was a staunch opponent of Bosniak identity), all of whom saw the changing of the name to Bosniak as a way to connect the Bosnian Muslims to the country of Bosnia and Herzegovina.

In other ex-Yugoslav countries with significant Slavic Muslim populations, adoption of the Bosniak name has been less consistent. The effects of this phenomenon are most evident in the censuses. For instance, the 2003 Montenegrin census recorded 48,184 people who registered as Bosniaks and 28,714 who registered as Muslim by nationality. Although Montenegro's Slavic Muslims form one ethnic community with a shared culture and history, this community is divided on whether to register as Bosniaks (i.e. adopt Bosniak national identity) or as Muslims by nationality. Similarly, the 2002 Slovenian census recorded 8,062 people who registered as Bosnians, presumably highlighting (in large part) the decision of many secular Bosniaks to primarily identify themselves in that way (a situation somewhat comparable to the "Yugoslav" option during the socialist period). However, such people comprise a minority (even in countries such as Montenegro where it is a significant political issue) while the great majority of Slavic Muslims in the former Yugoslavia have adopted the Bosniak national name.

September 28 is marked as Bosniaks' Day, which commemorates the anniversary of the 2nd Bosniak Assembly of 1993, when the national name "Bosniak" was reinstated.

== Relation to Bosnian nationalism ==
National consciousness developed in Bosnia and Herzegovina among the three ethnic groups in the 19th century, with emergent national identities being influenced by the millet system in place in Ottoman society (where 'religion and nationality were closely intertwined and often synonyms'). During Ottoman rule, there was a clear distinction between Muslims and non-Muslims. There were different tax categories and clothes, but only in the late 18th- and early 19th century "the differentiations develop into ethnic and national forms of identification", according to Soeren Keil. The bordering countries of Serbia and Croatia consequently laid claim to Bosnia and Herzegovina; a combination of religion, ethnic identity and the territorial claim was the basis for the three distinct nations.

Expressions of a Bosnian identity that transcended confessional boundaries were uncommon. Among Muslim ayans and certain Franciscan priests, a strong sense of Bosnian identity primarily reflected regional affiliation while maintaining a clear confessional dimension. For Christians, this regional sentiment coexisted with Serbian or Croatian national identification. For Muslims, it was tied to the protection of local privileges but did not challenge their allegiance to the Ottoman Empire. In this context, their use of the term "Bosniak" to denote regional origin lacked national significance. By the time the Ottoman period in Bosnia and Herzegovina ended in 1878, the concept of national identification remained largely absent among Bosnian Muslims.

Franciscan Ivan Franjo Jukić viewed Bosnians as exclusively Catholics and Eastern Orthodox Christians, while he regarded Muslims as Turks. He maintained that Bosnians, Serbs, and Croats were among the "tribes" that formed the broader "Illyrian nation." Sometimes the term Turčin (Turk) was commonly used to describe the Bosnian and other Slavic Muslims, designating religious, and not ethnic belonging. The Italian diplomat M. A. Pigafetta, wrote in 1585 that Bosnian Christian converts to Islam refused to be identified as "Turks", but as "Muslims".

Klement Božić, an interpreter at the Prussian consulate in Bosnia and Herzegovina in the 19th century, noted that Bosnian Christians referred to their Muslim fellow countrymen as "Turks" and Muslims from other places as "Ottomans," and that Bosnian Muslims would not call an Ottoman a Turk or consider him a brother. He also mentioned the mutual dislike between Bosnian Muslims and Ottomans. In 1829, geographer Conrad Malte-Brun wrote that Muslims in Constantinople commonly used the term "infidel" to describe Bosnian Muslims and thought Bosnians, descended from northern warriors, were barbaric due to their isolation from European enlightenment. In 1842, Croatian writer Matija Mažuranić observed that in Bosnia, Christians did not call themselves Bosniaks, while Muslims did and considered Christians as serfs. Muslim city dwellers, craftsmen, and artisans, who were free and tax-exempt, also identified as Bosniaks and spoke Bosniak language."

Before that, it was Franciscan Filip Lastrić (1700–1783) who first wrote on the commonality of the citizens in the Bosnian eyalet, regardless of their religion. In his work Epitome vetustatum provinciae Bosniensis (1765), he claimed that all inhabitants of the Bosnian province (eyalet) constituted "one people" of the same descent.

== Relation to Croat and Serb nationalism ==
As a melting ground for confrontations between different religions, national mythologies, and concepts of statehood, much of the historiography of Bosnia and Herzegovina has since the 19th century been the subject of competing Serb and Croat nationalist claims part of wider Serbian and Croatian hegemonic aspirations in Bosnia and Herzegovina, inherently interwoven into the complex nature of the Bosnian War at the end of the 20th century. As Andras Riedlmayer 's research for the Hague Tribunal demonstrates: "What happened in Bosnia is not just genocide, the willful destruction of the essential foundations of one particular community or group of people within a society" "[....]" "What happened in Bosnia is also described as sociocide, the murdering of a progressive, complex, and enlightened society so that a regressive, simple, and bigoted society could replace it."

Social anthropologist Tone Bringa develops that "Neither Bosniak, nor Croat, nor Serb identities can be fully understood with reference only to Islam or Christianity respectively, but have to be considered in a specific Bosnian context that has resulted in a shared history and locality among Bosnians of Islamic as well as Christian backgrounds."

According to Mitja Velikonja, Bosnia and Herzegovina constitutes "a historical entity which has its own identity and its own history". Robert Donia claims that as Serbia and Croatia only occupied parts of Bosnia and Herzegovina briefly in the Middle Ages, neither have any serious historical claims to Bosnia. Moreover, Donia states that although Bosnia did interact with its Serb and Croat neighbours over the centuries, it had a very different history and culture from them. 12th-century Byzantine historian John Kinnamos reported that Bosnia was not subordinated to the Grand Count of Serbia; rather the Bosnians "had their distinct way of life and government". The expert on medieval Balkan history John V.A. Fine reports that the Bosnians (Bošnjani) have been a distinct people since at least the 10th century.

It is noted that writers on nationalism in Yugoslavia or the Bosnian War tend to ignore or overlook the Bosnian Muslim ideology and activity and see them as victims of other nationalisms and not nationalistic themselves.

== Genetics ==
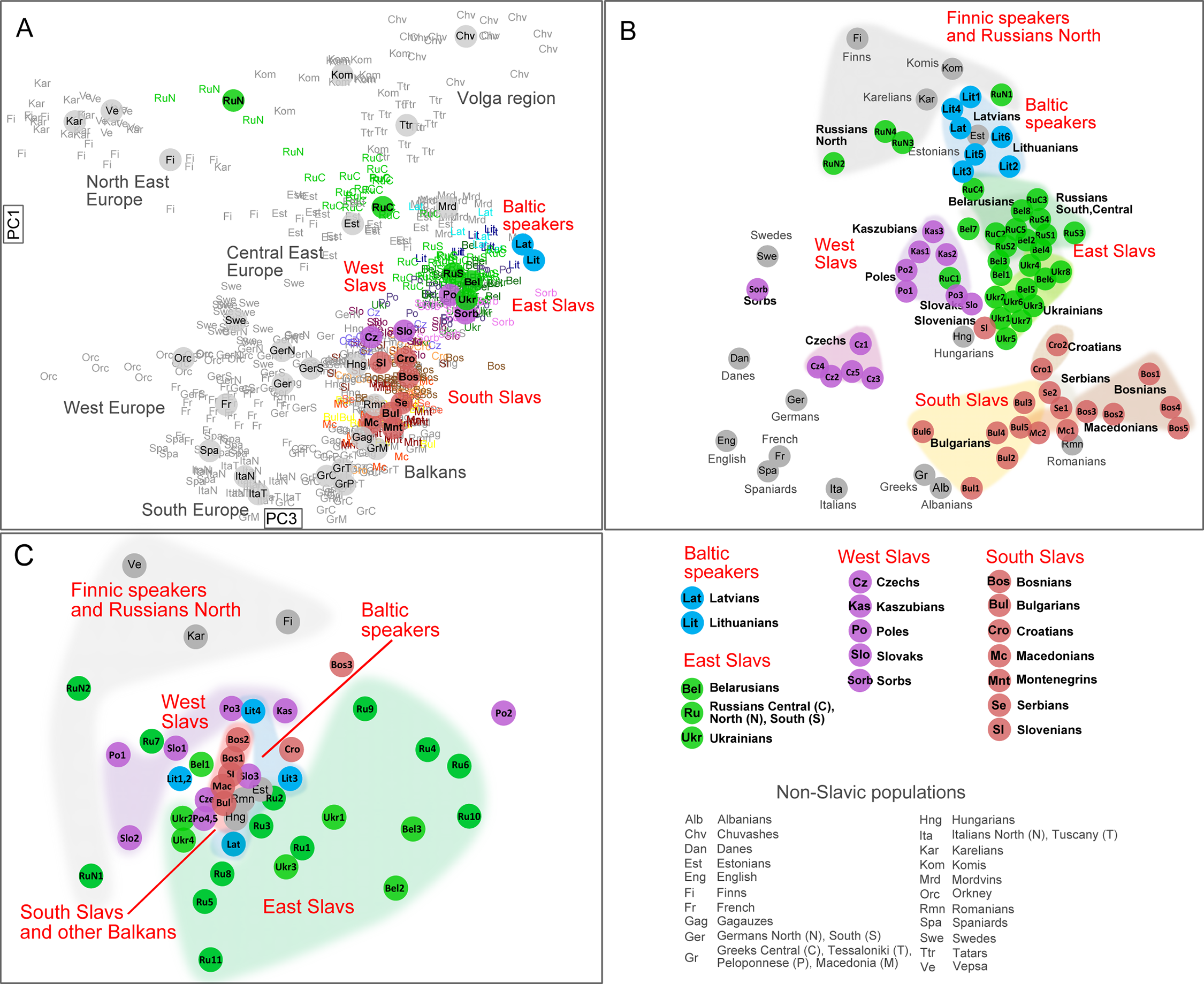
Genetic structure of Bosnians within European context according to three genetic systems: Autosomal DNA (A), Y-DNA (B) and mtDNA (C) per Kushniarevich et al. (2015)

According to 2013 autosomal IBD survey "of recent genealogical ancestry over the past 3,000 years at a continental scale", the speakers of Serbo-Croatian language share a very high number of common ancestors dating to the migration period approximately 1,500 years ago with Poland and Romania-Bulgaria cluster among others in Eastern Europe. It is concluded to be caused by the Hunnic and Slavic expansion, which was a "relatively small population that expanded over a large geographic area", particularly "the expansion of the Slavic populations into regions of low population density beginning in the sixth century" and that it is "highly coincident with the modern distribution of Slavic languages". The 2015 IBD analysis found that the South Slavs have lower proximity to Greeks than with East Slavs and West Slavs, and "even patterns of IBD sharing among East-West Slavs–'inter-Slavic' populations (Hungarians, Romanians and Gagauz)–and South Slavs, i.e. across an area of assumed historic movements of people including Slavs". The slight peak of shared IBD segments between South and East-West Slavs suggests a shared "Slavonic-time ancestry".

An autosomal analysis study of 90 samples showed that Western Balkan populations had a genetic uniformity, intermediate between South Europe and Eastern Europe, in line with their geographic location. According to the same study, Bosnians (together with Croatians) are by autosomal DNA closest to East European populations and overlap mostly with Hungarians. In the 2015 analysis, Bosnians formed a western South Slavic cluster with the Croatians and Slovenians in comparison to an eastern cluster formed by Macedonians and Bulgarians with Serbians in the middle. The western cluster (Bosnians included) inclines Hungarians, Czechs, and Slovaks, while the eastern cluster toward Romanians and some extent Greeks. Based on analysis of IBD sharing, Middle Eastern populations most likely did not contribute to genetics in Islamicized populations in the Western Balkans, including Bosniaks, as these share similar patterns with neighbouring Christian populations.

Y-DNA studies on Bosniaks (in Bosnia and Herzegovina) show close affinity to other neighbouring South Slavs. Y-DNA results show notable frequencies of I2 with 43.50% (especially its subclade I2-CTS10228+), R1a with 15.30% (mostly its two subclades R1a-CTS1211+ and R1a-M458+), E-V13 with 12.90% and J-M410 with 8.70%. Y-DNA studies done for the majority Bosniak populated cities of Zenica and Tuzla Canton, shows however a drastic increase of the two major haplogroups I2 and R1a. Haplogroup I2 scores 52.20% in Zenica (Peričić et al., 2005) and 47% in Tuzla Canton (Dogan et al., 2016), while R1a increases up to 24.60% and 23% in respective region. Haplogroup I2a-CTS10228, which is the most common haplogroup among Bosniaks and other neighbouring South Slavic populations, was found in one archaeogenetic sample (Sungir 6) (~900 YBP) near Vladimir, western Russia which belonged to the I-CTS10228>S17250>Y5596>Z16971>Y5595>A16681 subclade. It was also found in skeletal remains with artifacts, indicating leaders, of Hungarian conquerors of the Carpathian Basin from the 9th century, part of Western Eurasian-Slavic component of the Hungarians. According to Fóthi et al. (2020), the distribution of ancestral subclades like of I-CTS10228 among contemporary carriers indicates a rapid expansion from Southeastern Poland, is mainly related to the Slavs, and the "largest demographic explosion occurred in the Balkans". Principal component analysis of Y-chromosomal haplogroup frequencies among the three ethnic groups in Bosnia and Herzegovina, Serbs, Croats, and Bosniaks, showed that Bosnian Serbs and Bosniaks are by Y-DNA closer to each other than either of them is to Bosnian Croats.

In addition, mtDNA studies show that the Bosnian population partly share similarities with other Southern European populations (especially with mtDNA haplogroups such as pre-HV (today known as mtDNA haplogroup R0), HV2 and U1), but are for the mostly featured by a huge combination of mtDNA subclusters that indicates a consanguinity with Central and Eastern Europeans, such as modern German, West Slavic, East Slavic and Finno-Ugric populations. There is especially the observed similarity between Bosnian, Russian and Finnish samples (with mtDNA subclusters such as U5b1, Z, H-16354, H-16263, U5b-16192-16311 and U5a-16114A). The huge differentiation between Bosnian and Slovene samples of mtDNA subclusters that are also observed in Central and Eastern Europe, may suggests a broader genetic heterogeneity among the Slavs that settled the Western Balkans during the early Middle Ages. The 2019 study of ethnic groups of Tuzla Canton of Bosnia and Herzegovina (Bosniaks, Croats and Serbs) found "close gene similarity among maternal gene pools of the ethnic groups of Tuzla Canton", which is "suggesting similar effects of the paternal and maternal gene flows on genetic structure of the three main ethnic groups of modern Bosnia and Herzegovina".

A 2023 archaeogenetic study published in Cell, confirmed that the spread of Slavic language in Southeastern Europe was because of large movements of people with specific Eastern European ancestry, and that more than half of the ancestry of most peoples in the Balkans today originates from the medieval Slavic migrations, with around 67% in Croats, 58% in Serbs, 55% in Romanians, 51% in Bulgarians, 40% in Greek Macedonians, 31% in Albanians and 30% in Peloponnesian Greeks.

== Language ==
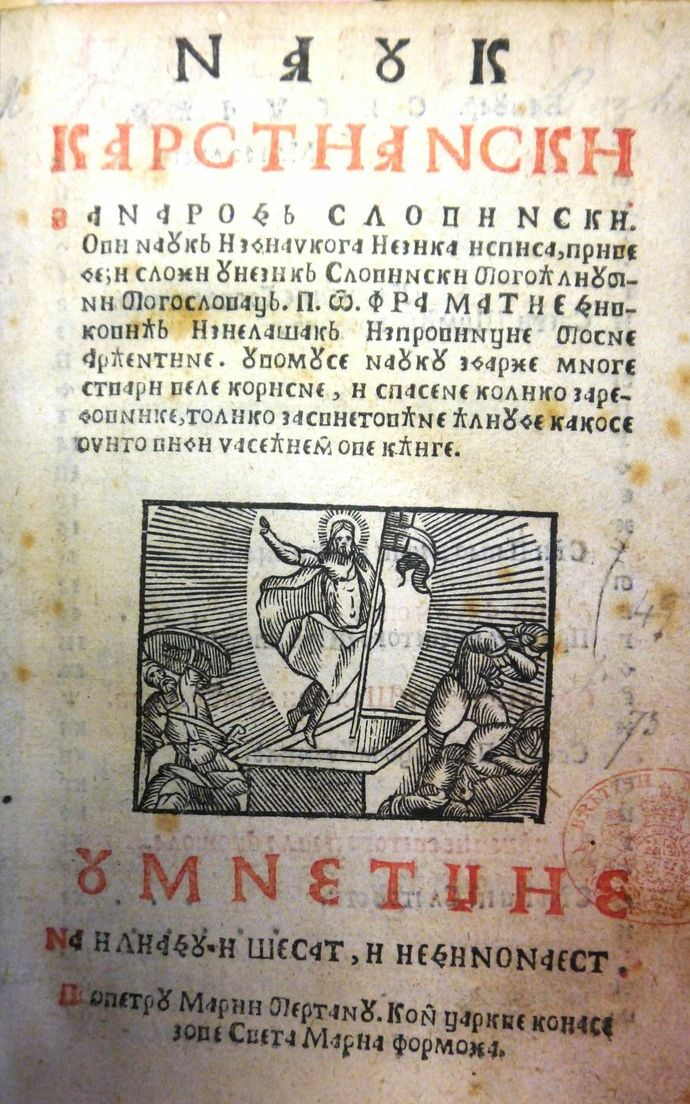
The Nauk karstianski za narod slovinski (Christian doctrine for the Slavic people), written by Matija Divković, is regarded as the first Bosnian language printed book, published in Venice in 1611

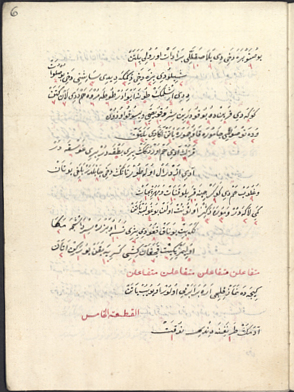
Bosnian language dictionary Magbuli 'arif or Potur Šahidija, written by Muhamed Hevaji Uskufi Bosnevi in 1631 using a Bosnian variant of the Perso-Arabic script.

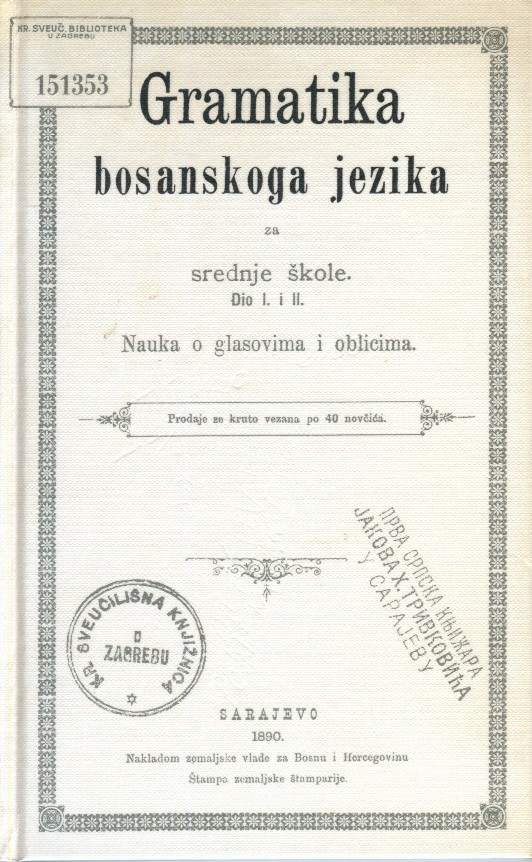
A Bosnian grammar from 1890 written by the unsigned author Frano Vuletić.

Most Bosniaks speak the Bosnian language, a South Slavic language of the Western South Slavic subgroup. Standard Bosnian is considered a variety of Serbo-Croatian, as mutually intelligible with the Croatian and Serbian languages which are all based on the Shtokavian dialect. As result, paraphrases such as Serbo-Croat-Bosnian (SCB) or Bosnian/Croatian/Serbian (BCS) tend to be used in English on occasion.

At the vernacular level, Bosniaks are more linguistically homogeneous than Serbs or Croats who also speak non-standard dialects besides Shtokavian. Concerning lexicon, Bosnian is characterised by its larger number of Ottoman Turkish (as well as Arabic and Persian) loanwords (called Orientalisms) compared to the other Serbo-Croatian varieties.

The first official dictionary in the Bosnian language was published in 1992. Church Slavonic is attested since at least the Kingdom of Bosnia; the Charter of Ban Kulin, written in Cyrillic, remains one of the oldest written South Slavic state documents.

The modern Bosnian language principally uses the Latin alphabet. However, Cyrillic (popularly termed Bosnian Cyrillic or Bosančica) was employed much earlier, as evident in medieval charters and on monumental tombstones (stećci) found scattered throughout the landscape. One of the most important documents is the Charter of Ban Kulin, which is regarded by Bosnian authors as one of the oldest official recorded documents to be written in Bosnian Cyrillic. The use of Cyrillic was largely replaced by Arebica (Matufovica), a Bosnian variant of the Perso-Arabic script, upon the introduction of Islam in the 15th century, first among the elite, then amongst the public, and was commonly used up until the 19th century.

== Culture ==
=== Folklore ===
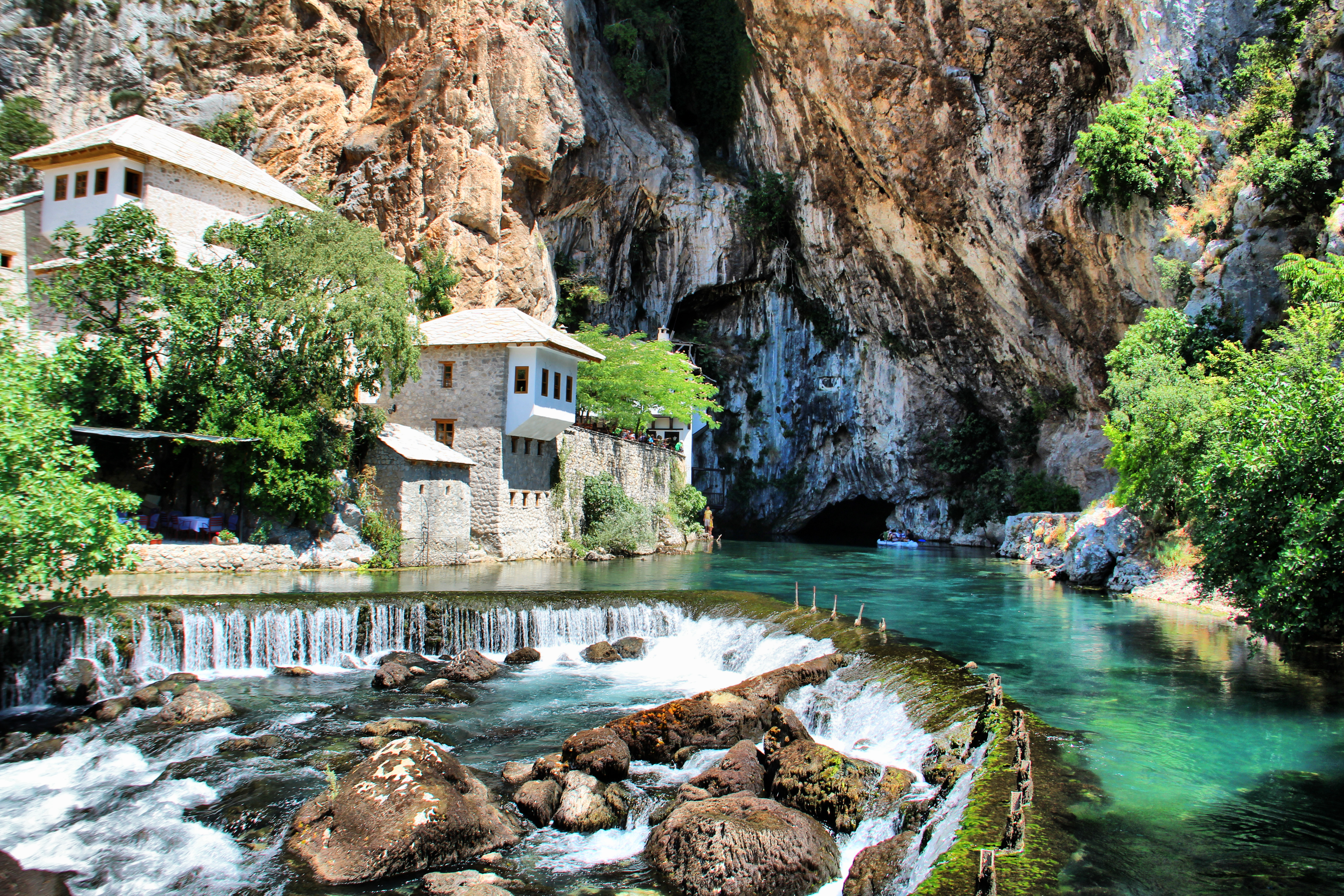
Buna river, near the town of Blagaj in southern Herzegovina. Blagaj is situated at the spring of the Buna river and a historical tekke (tekija or Dervish monastery). The Blagaj Tekija was built around 1520, with elements of Ottoman architecture and Mediterranean style and is considered a national monument.

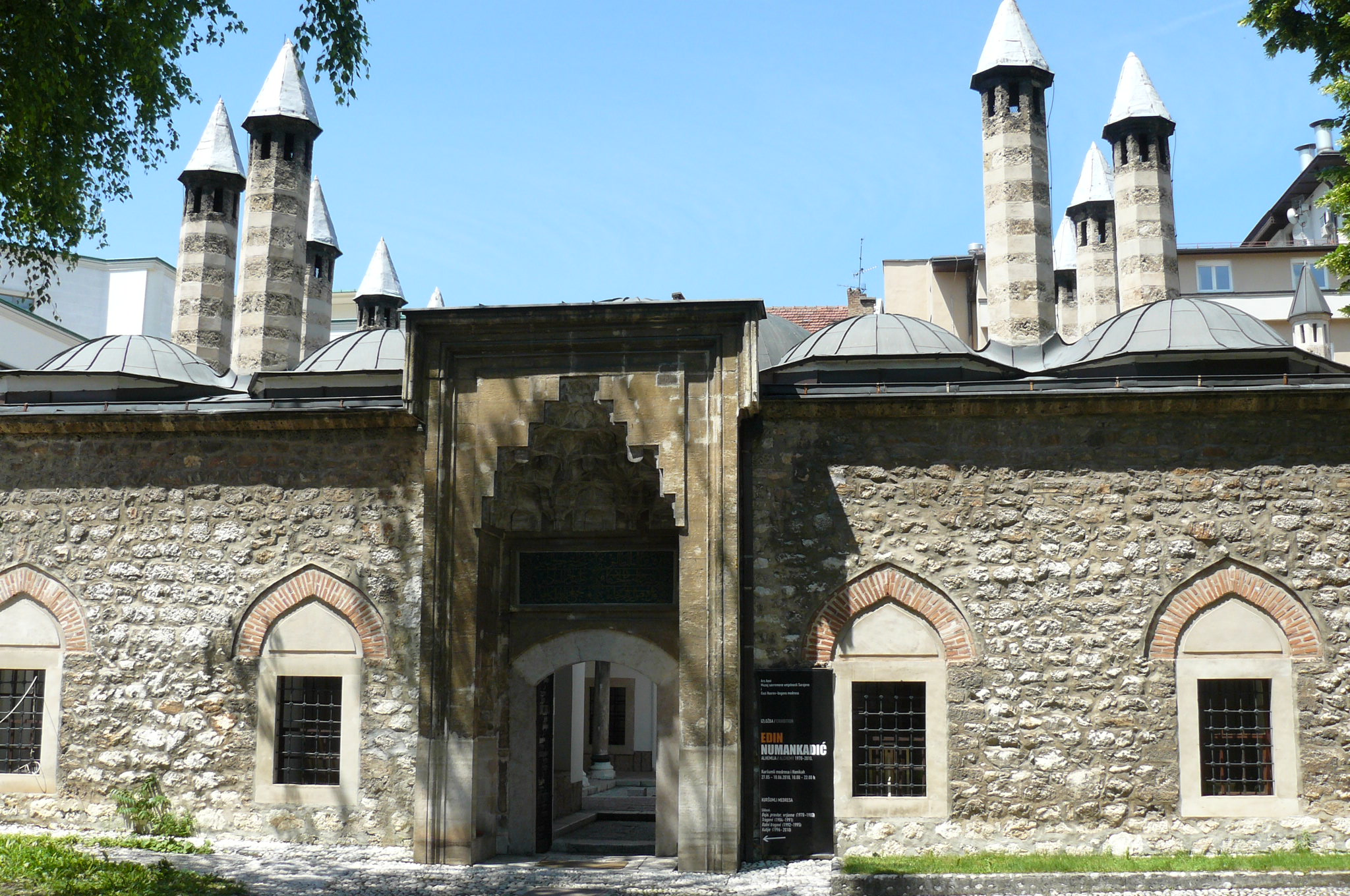
Gazi Husrev-begova medresa or Kuršumli medresa, madrasa founded in 1537 in honor to Gazi Husrev Bey's mother Seldžuklija, in the old part of Sarajevo.

There are many signs of pagan practices being carried over first into Christianity and later into Islam in Bosnia and Herzegovina – for example, the use of the mountain tops as a place of worship, and the name of pagan gods, such as Perun and Thor, that survived in oral tradition until the twentieth century. Slavic traditions such as dragons, fairies and Vila, are also present. Fairies are often mentioned in Bosniak epics, poetry and folk songs. Well known are "gorske vile", or fairies from the mountains which dance on very green meadows. The cult of post-pagan Perun survived as the day of Elijah the Thunderer which was another important event for Bosnian Muslims. Muhamed Hadžijahić mentions: "In Muslim celebration of this holiday, we see traces of ancient pagan traditions related to the cult of sun and rain." This tradition is among Bosnian Muslims known as Aliđun and among the Serbs as Ilijevdan. Pre-Slavic influences are far less common but present. Certain elements of paleo-Balkan beliefs have also been found. One of these traditions which could originate from the pre-Slavic era, is a Bosniak tradition of placing a horse's skull tied with a rope into river Bosna, to fight off drought. Djevojačka pećina, or the Maiden's Cave, is a traditional place of the 'Rain Prayer' near Kladanj in north-eastern Bosnia, where Bosnian Muslims gather to pray for the soul of the maiden whose grave is said to be at the entrance to the cave. This tradition is of pre-Islamic origin and is a place where the followers of the medieval Bosnian Church held their pilgrimage. Another Bosnian Muslim place of pilgrimage is Ajvatovica near Prusac in central Bosnia and Herzegovina, which is the largest Islamic traditional, religious and cultural event in Europe, and is a place where devout Bosnian Muslims remember and give thanks to the founder of the holy site, Ajvaz-dedo, whose forty-day prayers were heard by Allah and much-needed water came out of a rock that had split open in a miraculous act. Even though the pilgrimage at Ajvatovica is a marking of the sixteenth-century conversion to Islam in Bosnia,

National heroes are typically historical figures, whose lives and skills in battle are emphasized. These include figures such as Ban Kulin, the founder of medieval Bosnia who has come to acquire a legendary status. The historian William Miller wrote in 1921 that "even today, the people regard him as a favourite of the fairies, and his reign as a golden age."

=== Traditions and customs ===
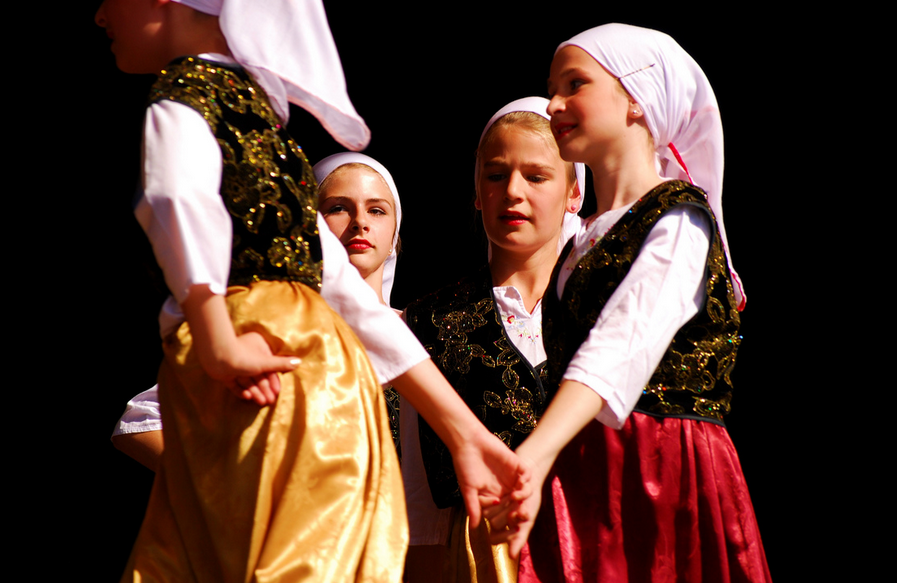
Bosniak girls dancing a traditional kolo dance

The nation takes pride in the native melancholic folk songs sevdalinka, the precious medieval filigree manufactured by old Sarajevo craftsmen, and a wide array of traditional wisdom transmitted to newer generations by word of mouth, but in recent years written down in several books. Another prevalent tradition is "Muštuluk", whereby a gift is owed to any bringer of good news.

Rural folk traditions in Bosnia include the shouted, polyphonic ganga and ravne pjesme (flat song) styles, as well as instruments like a wooden flute and šargija. The gusle, an instrument found throughout the Balkans, is also used to accompany ancient South Slavic epic poems. The most versatile and skilful gusle-performer of Bosniak ethnicity was the Montenegrin Bosniak Avdo Međedović (1875–1953).

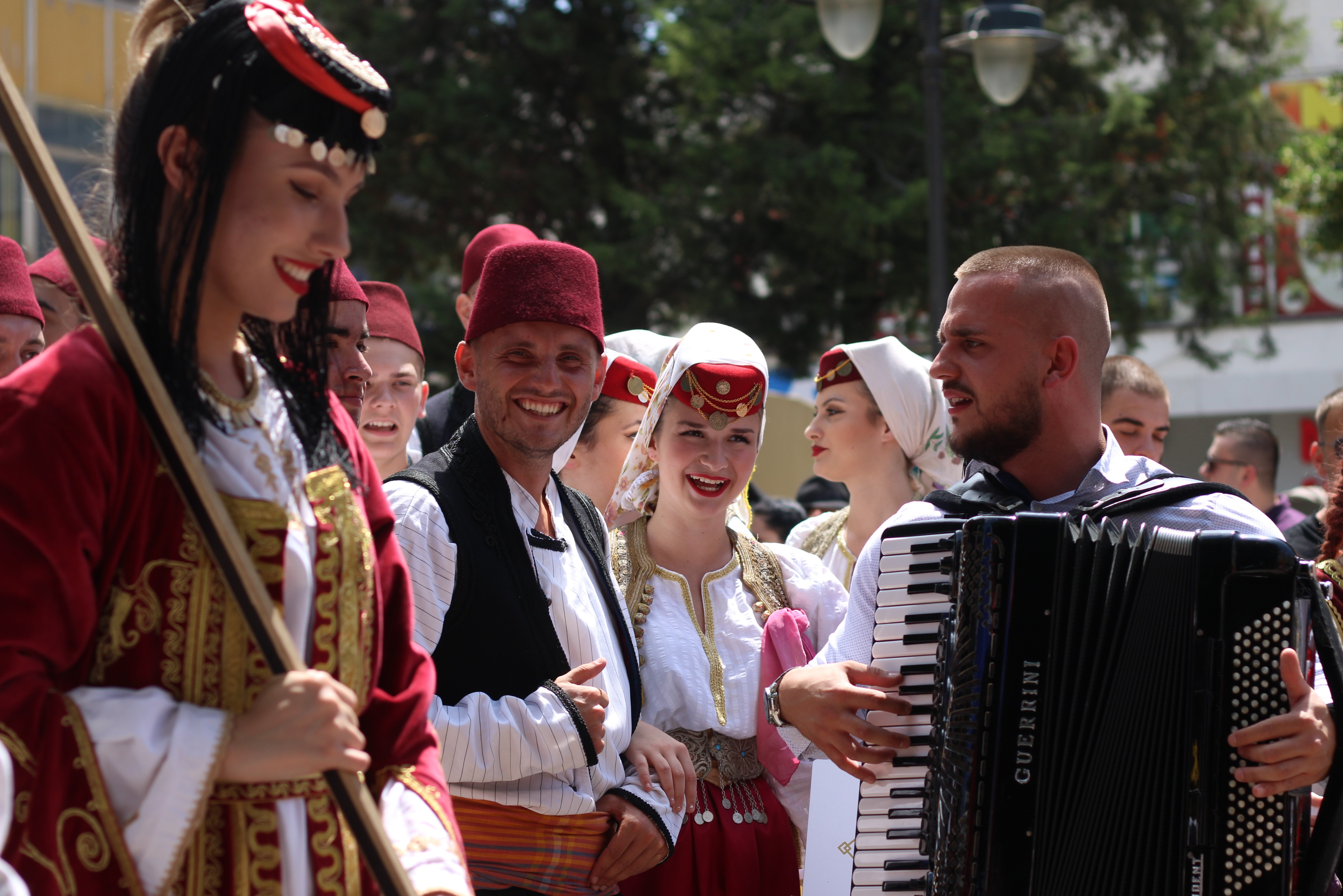
Bosniaks in traditional costumes

Probably the most distinctive and identifiably Bosniak music, Sevdalinka is a kind of emotional, melancholic folk song that often describes sad subjects such as love and loss, the death of a dear person or heartbreak. Sevdalinkas were traditionally performed with a saz, a Turkish string instrument, which was later replaced by the accordion. However, the more modern arrangement, to the derision of some purists, is typically a vocalist accompanied by the accordion along with snare drums, upright bass, guitars, clarinets and violins. Sevdalinkas are unique to Bosnia and Herzegovina. They arose in Ottoman Bosnia as urban Bosnian music with often oriental influences. In the early 19th century, Bosniak poet Umihana Čuvidina contributed greatly to sevdalinka with her poems about her lost love, which she sang. The poets which in large has contributed to the rich heritage of the Bosniak people include among others Derviš-paša Bajezidagić, Abdullah Bosnevi, Hasan Kafi Pruščak, Abdurrahman Sirri, Abdulvehab Ilhamija, Mula Mustafa Bašeskija, Hasan Kaimija, Ivan Franjo Jukić, Safvet-beg Bašagić, Musa Ćazim Ćatić, Mak Dizdar, as many prominent prose writers, such as Enver Čolaković, Skender Kulenović, Abdulah Sidran, Nedžad Ibrišimović, Zaim Topčić and Zlatko Topčić. Historical journals such as Gajret, Behar and Bošnjak are some of the most prominent publications, which in a big way contributed to the preservation of the Bosniak identity in the late 19th and early 20th century. The Bosnian literature is generally known for their ballads; The Mourning Song of the Noble Wife of the Hasan Aga (or better known as Hasanaginica), Smrt Omera i Merime (Omer and Merimas death) and Smrt braće Morića (The death of brothers Morić). Hasanaginica were told from generation to generation in oral form, until it was finally written and published in 1774 by an Italian anthropologist Alberto Fortis, in his book Viaggio in Dalmazia ("Journey to Dalmatia").

=== Religion ===
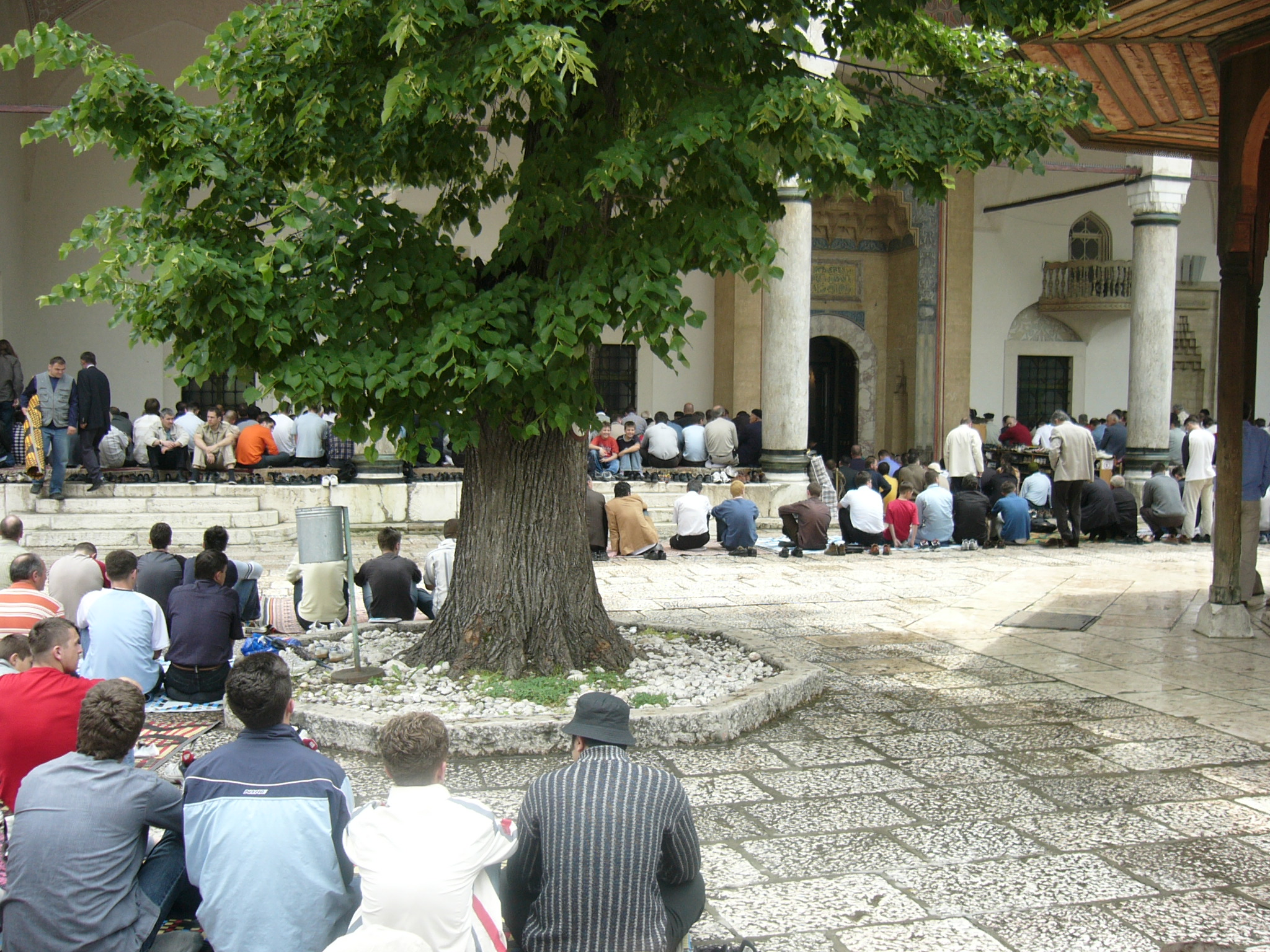
Gazi Husrev-beg Mosque in Sarajevo, Bosnia and Herzegovina

The Bosnian Muslims (Bosniaks) are traditionally and predominantly Sunni Muslim. Historically, Sufism has also played a significant role among the Bosnian Muslims who tended to favour more mainstream Sunni orders such as the Naqshbandiyya, Rifa'i and Qadiriyya. There are also Bosniaks who can be categorized as Nondenominational Muslims and Cultural Muslims. The Bosnian Islamic community has also been influenced by other currents within Islam than the one in Bosnia and Herzegovina prevailing Hanafi school, especially since the 1990s war. The position of Sufism in Bosnia during the Ottoman era was legally the same as in other parts of the empire. Bosnian Sufis produced literature, often in oriental languages (Arabic and Turkish), although a few also wrote in Serbo-Croatian, such as Abdurrahman Sirri (1785–1846/47) and Abdulwahāb Žepčewī (1773–1821). Another Sufi from Bosnia was Sheikh Hamza Bali, whose doctrines were considered to contradict the official interpretation of Islam. His supporters hamzevije formed a religious movement that is often described as a sect closely related to the tariqa of bajrami-melami. Another prominent Bosniak Sufi was Hasan Kafi Pruščak, a Sufi thinker and the most prominent figure of the scientific literature and intellectual life of the 16th century Bosniaks.

In a 1998 public opinion poll, 78.3% of Bosniaks in the Federation of Bosnia and Herzegovina declared themselves to be religious. Bosnian Muslims tend to often be described as moderate, secular and European-oriented compared to other Muslim groups. Bosniaks have been described as "Cultural Muslims" or "Progressive Muslims".

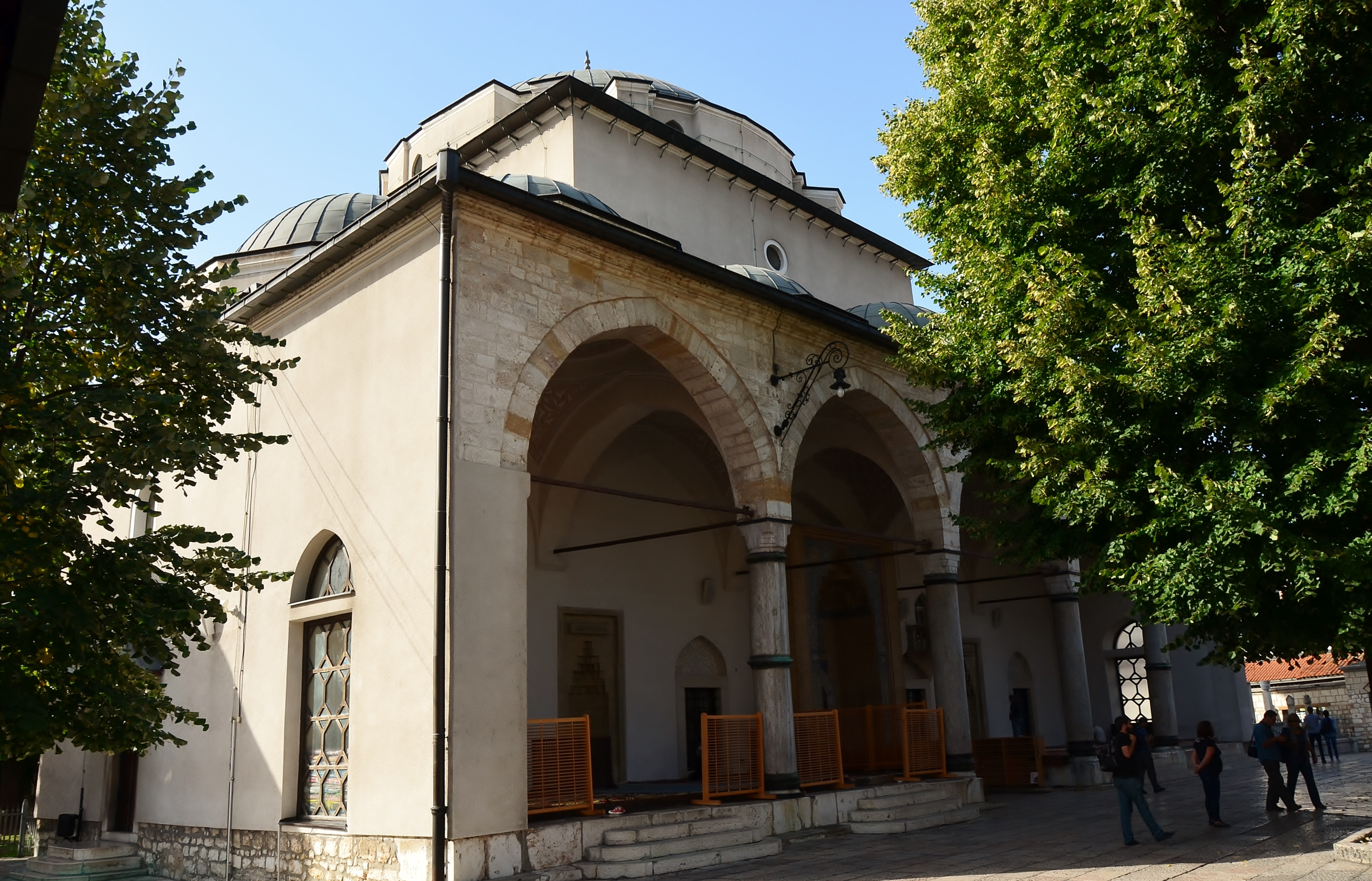
Gazi Husrev-beg mosque constructed in 1532 by the sanjak-bey of Bosnia Gazi Husrev-beg, located in Sarajevo.

Kjell Magnusson points out that religion played a major role in the processes that shaped the national movements and the formation of the new states in the Balkans after the Ottoman retreat, since the Ottomans distinguished peoples after their religious affiliations. Although religion seemingly has a smaller role in the daily lives of the ethnic groups of Bosnia and Herzegovina today, the following stereotypes are still rather current, namely, that the Serbs are Orthodox, the Croats Catholic and the Bosniaks Muslim; those native Bosnians who remained Christian and did not convert to Islam over time came to identify as ethnic Serb or Croat, helping to explain the apparent ethnic mix in Bosnia-Herzegovina. Still, however, there are a few individuals who violate the aforementioned pattern and practice other religions actively, often due to intermarriage.

=== Surnames and given names ===
There are some Bosniak surnames of foreign origin, indicating that the founder of the family came from a place outside Bosnia and Herzegovina. Many such Bosniak surnames have Albanian, Vlach, Turkic or Arab origins. Examples of such surnames include Arnautović (from Arnaut – Turkish ethnonym used to denote Albanians), Vlasić (from Vlach people), Tatarević (from Tatar people) and Arapović (from Arap – Turkish ethnonym used to denote Arabs). There are also some surnames which are presumed to be of pre-Slavic origin. Some examples of such surnames may be of Illyrian or Celtic origin, such as the surname Mataruga and Motoruga.

Given names or first names among Bosniaks have mostly Arabic, Persian or Turkish roots such as Osman, Mehmed, Muhamed, Mirza, Alija, Ismet, Kemal, Hasan, Ibrahim, Irfan, Mustafa, Ahmed, Husein, Hamza, Haris, Halid, Refik, Tarik, Faruk, Abdulah, Amer, Sulejman, Mahir, Enver, and many others. South Slavic given names such as "Zlatan" or "Zlatko" are also present primarily among non-religious Bosniaks. What is notable however is that due to the structure of the Bosnian language, many of the Muslim given names have been altered to create uniquely Bosniak given names. Some of the Oriental given names have been shortened. For example: Huso is short for Husein, Ahmo is short for Ahmed, and Meho is short for Mehmed. One example of this is that of the Bosniak humorous characters Mujo and Suljo, whose given names are Bosniak short forms of Mustafa and Sulejman. More present still is the transformation of given names that in Arabic or Turkish are confined to one gender to apply to the other sex. In Bosnian, simply taking away the letter "a" changes the traditionally feminine "Jasmina" into the popular male name "Jasmin". Similarly, adding an "a" to the typically male "Mahir" results in the feminine "Mahira".

=== Symbols ===
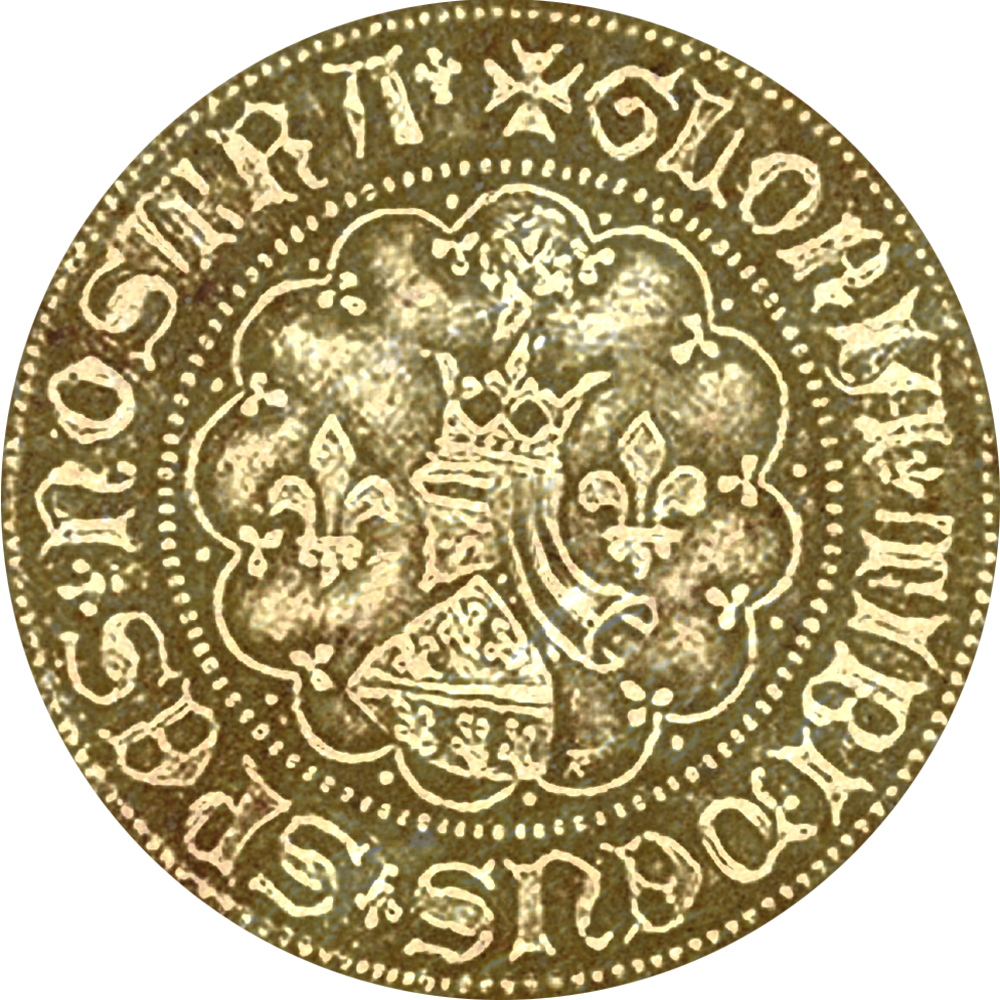
The coat of arms of the Kotromanić dynasty on a 14th-century reverse – with the fleur-de-lis, which is today used as a Bosniak national symbol and was formerly featured on the flag of the Republic of Bosnia and Herzegovina

The traditional symbol of the Bosniak people is a fleur-de-lis coat of arms, decorated with six golden lilies, also referred to Lilium bosniacum, a native lily of the region. This Bosniak national symbol is derived from the coat of arms of the medieval Kingdom of Bosnia and was particularly used in the context of the rule of the Bosnian King Tvrtko I of Bosnia. According to some sources, the Bosnian coat of arms, with six golden lilies, originated from the French descended Capetian House of Anjou. The member of this dynasty, Louis I of Hungary, was married to Elizabeth of Bosnia, daughter of the ban Stephen II of Bosnia, with Tvrtko I consequently embracing the heraldic lily as a symbol of the Bosnian royalty in token of the familial relations between the Angevins and the Bosnian royal family. It is also likely that the Bosnians adopted, or were granted, the fleur-de-lis on their coat of arms as a reward for taking the Angevin side.

This emblem was revived in 1992 as a symbol of Bosnian nationhood and represented the flag of the Republic of Bosnia and Herzegovina between 1992 and 1998. Although the state insignia was replaced in 1999 at the request of the other two ethnic groups, the flag of the Federation of Bosnia and Herzegovina still features a fleur-de-lis alongside the Croatian chequy. The Bosnian fleur-de-lis also appears on the flags and arms of many cantons, municipalities, cities and towns. It is still used as official insignia of the Bosniak regiment of the Armed Forces of Bosnia and Herzegovina. The Fleur-de-lis can also be commonly found as ornament in mosques and on Muslim tombstones. Swedish historian Senimir Resić states that the emblem of the fleur-de-lis (symbolizing the Christian Middle Ages) which became a national symbol of Bosniaks in 1992, was, in that time of war and Islamophobia, intended to draw attention to the Western world of the Christian and medieval European past of the Bosnian Muslims.

Another Bosniak flag dates from the Ottoman era and is a white crescent moon and star on a green background. The flag was also the symbol of the short-lived independent Bosnia in the 19th century and of the Bosnian uprising against the Turks led by Husein Gradaščević.

== Geographical distribution ==
=== Diaspora ===
World map of the Bosnian diaspora (including Bosniaks). Bosnia and Herzegovina + 100,000 + 10,000 + 1,000

There is a significant Bosniak diaspora in Europe, Turkey as well as in North America in such countries as the United States and Canada.

- Turkey: The community in Turkey has its origins predominantly in the exodus of Muslims from the Bosnia Eyalet taking place in the 19th and early 20th century as result of the collapse of Ottoman rule in the Balkans. According to estimates commissioned in 2008 by the National Security Council of Turkey as many as 2 million Turkish citizens are of Bosniak ancestry. Bosniaks mostly live in the Marmara Region, in the north-west. The biggest Bosniak community in Turkey is in Istanbul; the borough Yenibosna (formerly Saraybosna, after Sarajevo), saw rapid migration from the Ottoman Balkans after the founding of the Republic of Turkey. There are notable Bosniak communities in İzmir, Karamürsel, Yalova, Bursa and Edirne.
- United States: The first Bosnian arrivals came around the 1860s. According to a 2000 estimate, there are some 350,000 Americans of Bosnian ancestry. Bosniaks were early leaders in the establishment of Chicago's Muslim community. In 1906, they established Džemijetul Hajrije (The Benevolent Society) of Illinois to preserve the community's religious and national traditions as well as to provide mutual assistance for funerals and illness. The organization established chapters in Gary, Indiana, in 1913, and Butte, Montana, in 1916, and is the oldest existing Muslim organization in the United States. There are numerous Bosniak cultural, sports and religious associations. Bosnian-language newspapers and other periodicals are published in many states; the largest in the United States is the St. Louis-based newspaper "Sabah". At the peak of the Bosnian presence in St. Louis 70,000 Bosnians lived in the city.
- Canada: According to the 2001 census, 25,665 people claimed Bosnian ancestry. A large majority of Bosnian Canadians emigrated to Canada during and after the Bosnian War, although Bosnian migration dates back to the 19th century. Traditional centres of residence and culture for people from Bosnia and Herzegovina are in Toronto, Montreal and Vancouver. Numerous Bosniak cultural, sports and religious associations, Bosnian-language newspapers and other periodicals are published in many states. The largest Bosnian organisation in Canada is the Congress of North American Bosniaks.

== See also ==
- List of Bosniaks
- List of massacres of Bosniaks
- Bosnian genocide
- Ethnic groups in Bosnia and Herzegovina
- Bushnak
- Bosnian War
  - Intra-Bosnian Muslim War
  - Croat–Bosniak War

== Sources ==
Books

- Allworth, Edward (1994). Muslim Communities Reemerge: Historical Perspectives on Nationality, Politics, and Opposition in the Former Soviet Union and Yugoslavia. Duke University Press. ISBN 978-0-8223-1490-5.
- Basic, Denis (2009). The Roots of the Religious, Ethnic, and National Identity of the Bosnian-Herzegovinian Muslims. University of Washington. ISBN 978-1-109-12463-7. Archived from the original on 28 June 2014.
- Bougarel, Xavier (2018). Islam and Nationhood in Bosnia-Herzegovina: Surviving Empires. New York: Bloomsbury Publishing. ISBN 978-1-350-00361-3.
- Bougarel, Xavier (2009). "Od "Muslimana" do "Bošnjaka": pitanje nacionalnog imena bosanskih muslimana" [From "Muslims" to "Bosniaks": the question of the national name of the Bosnian Muslims]. Rasprave o nacionalnom identitetu Bošnjaka – Zbornik radova [The discussions on the national identity of Bosniaks – a collection of papers]. Institut Za Istoriju.
- Bulić, Dejan (2013). "The Fortifications of the Late Antiquity and the Early Byzantine Period on the Later Territory of the South-Slavic Principalities, and their re-occupation". The World of the Slavs: Studies of the East, West and South Slavs: Civitas, Oppidas, Villas and Archeological Evidence (7th to 11th Centuries AD). Belgrade: The Institute for History. pp. 137–234. ISBN 978-86-7743-104-4.
- Donia, Robert J.; Fine, John Van Antwerp Jr. (1994). Bosnia and Hercegovina: A Tradition Betrayed. C. Hurst & Co. Publishers. ISBN 978-1-85065-212-0.
- Džaja, Srećko Matko (1999). Konfesionalnost i nacionalnost Bosne i Hercegovine [Religion and Ethnicity of Bosnia and Herzegovina] (in Croatian). Mostar: ZIRAL. ISBN 953-6364-21-2.
- Etnička obilježja stanovništva: rezultati za Republiku i po opštinama [Ethnic characteristics of the population: results for the Republic and by municipalities] (PDF) (in Serbo-Croatian). Sarajevo: Agency for Statistics of the Republic of Bosnia and Herzegovina. 1993.
- Fine, John Van Antwerp Jr. (1991). The Early Medieval Balkans: A Critical Survey from the Sixth to the Late Twelfth Century. University of Michigan Press. ISBN 978-0-472-08149-3.
- Imamović, Mustafa (1997). Historija Bošnjaka [History of the Bosniaks] (in Bosnian). Sarajevo: Bošnjačka zajednica kulture Preporod. ISBN 9958-815-00-1.
- Friedman, Francine "The Bosnian Muslims: The Making of a Yugoslav Nation," in Melissa Bokovoy, Jill Irvine, and Carol Lilly, eds., State-Society Relations in Yugoslavia, 1945–1992, 1997
- Hadžijahić, Muhamed (1990). Porijeklo bosanskih Muslimana [The origin of the Bosnian Muslims] (in Serbo-Croatian). Sarajevo: Bosna.
- Hadžijahić, Muhamed (1990). Od tradicije do identiteta: geneza nacionalnog pitanja bosanskih Muslimana [From Tradition to Identity: The Genesis of the National Question of Bosnian Muslims] (in Serbo-Croatian) (2nd ed.). Sarajevo: Islamska zajednica.
- Hoare, Marko Attila (1 February 2014). The Bosnian Muslims in the Second World War. Oxford University Press. ISBN 978-0-19-936531-9.
- Huković, Muhamed; Kasumović, Ahmet; Smailović, Ismet (1990). Muhamed Hevai Uskufi. Sarajevo: Međurepublička zajednica za kulturno-prosvjetnu djelatnost.
- Kaimakamova, Miliana; Salamon, Maciej (2007). Byzantium, new peoples, new powers: the Byzantino-Slav contact zone, from the ninth to the fifteenth century. Towarzystwo Wydawnicze "Historia Iagellonica". ISBN 978-83-88737-83-1.
- Karčić, Fikret (1995). The Bosniaks and the Challenges of Modernity: Late Ottoman and Hapsburg Times.
- Karčić, Fikret (2022). Faith and Loyalty: Bosniaks and the Austro-Hungarian Empire. London: International Institute of Islamic Thought. ISBN 978-1-64205-764-5.
- Malcolm, Noel (1996) [1994]. Bosnia: A Short History (2nd ed.). New York University Press. ISBN 978-0-8147-5561-7.
- Memić, Mutafa (1997). "Sarajevo kao migracioni centar muslimana iz Crne Gore" [Sarajevo as a migration centre of Muslims of Montenegro]. In Juzbašić, Dževad (ed.). Prilozi historiji Sarajeva [Papers on history of Sarajevo] (in Bosnian). Sarajevo: Institut za istoriju.
- Nametak, Fehim (1989). Pregled književnog stvaranja bosansko-hercegovačkih Muslimana na turskom jeziku. Sarajevo: El-Kalem.
- Pinson, Mark (1994). The Muslims of Bosnia-Herzegovina: Their Historic Development from the Middle Ages to the Dissolution of Yugoslavia. Harvard University Press. ISBN 978-0-932885-09-8.
- Ramet, Sabrina P. (2006). The Three Yugoslavias: State-Building and Legitimation, 1918–2004. Indiana University Press. ISBN 0-253-34656-8.
- Redžić, Enver (2005). Bosnia and Herzegovina in the Second World War. Frank Cass. ISBN 0-7146-5625-9.
- Smajić, Ramiza (2022). Migracije i Bosanski ejalet 1683-1718 [Migrations and the Eyalet of Bosnia 1683-1718] (in Bosnian). Sarajevo: Univerzitet u Sarajevu - Institut za historiju. ISBN 978-9958-649-54-7.
- Tomasevich, Jozo (2001). War and Revolution in Yugoslavia, 1941–1945: Occupation and Collaboration. Stanford University Press. ISBN 978-0-8047-0857-9.
- Velikonja, Mitja (2003). Religious Separation and Political Intolerance in Bosnia-Herzegovina. Texas A&M University Press. ISBN 978-1-58544-226-3.

Journals

- Babuna, Aydin (1999). "Nationalism and the Bosnian muslims". East European Quarterly. 33 (2): 195–.
- Bandžović, Safet (2001). "Iseljavanje muslimanskog stanovništva iz Kneževine Srbije u Bosanski vilajet (1862–1867)" [The Emmigration of the Muslim Population from the Principality of Serbia to the Eyalet of Bosnia (1862–1867)] (PDF) (in Bosnian). Sarajevo: Ibn Sina – Naučnoistraživački institut Sarajevo.
- Bandžović, Safet (2006). "Bošnjaci i balkanski muhadžirski pokreti" [Bosniaks and the Balkan muhajir movements]. Godišnjak Bošnjačke zajednice kulture »Preporod« (in Bosnian) (1). Sarajevo: 322–343.
- Buturović, Đenana (1992). "Bosnian Muslim Epic Poetry". Narodne Pjesme Muslimana U Bosni I Hercegovini. 5 i 6 (1): 587–589.
- Džaja, Srećko Matko (1992). "Katoličanstvo u Bosni i Hercegovini od Kulina bana do austro-ugarske okupacije". Croatica Christiana Periodica (in Croatian). Catholicism in Bosnia and Herzegovina from Ban Kulin to Austrian-Hungairan occupation: Catholic Faculty of Theology, University of Zagreb.
- Bauer, Deron. The ethno-religious identity of Bosnian Muslims: A literature-based ethnography. Fuller Theological Seminary, School of Intercultural Studies, 2012.
- Friedman, Francine (2000). "The muslim slavs of Bosnia and Herzegovina (with reference to the Sandzak of Novi Pazar): Islam as national identity". Nationalities Papers. 28 (1): 165–180. doi:10.1080/00905990050002498. S2CID 154938106.
- Hamourtziadou, Lily (2002). "The Bosniaks: from nation to threat". Journal of Southern Europe and the Balkans. 4 (2): 141–156. doi:10.1080/1461319022000021594. S2CID 153647785.
- Heršak, Emil (1993). "Panoptikum migracija − Hrvati, hrvatski prostor i Evropa" [Panopticon of Migrations − Croats, Croatian Space and Europe]. Migracijske i etničke teme (in Croatian). 9 (3–4). Zagreb: Institut za migracije i narodnosti.
- Kriještorac, Mirsad (2016). "Bosnian Muslims and Their Bosniak Identity". Journal of Muslim Minority Affairs. doi:10.1080/13602004.2016.1248171 (inactive 19 June 2026).
- Kofman, Daniel (2001). "Self-determination in a multiethnic state: Bosnians, Bosniaks, Croats and Serbs". Reconstructing Multiethnic Societies: The Case of Bosnia-Herzegovina: 31–62.
- Kurtić, Najil (2013). "Novine u Bosni u osmanskom periodu i nacionalno samoidentificiranje Bošnjaka" [Newspapers in Bosnia in the Ottoman period and the national self-identification of Bosniaks] (PDF). Bosanski jezik (in Bosnian). 10: 107–125.
- Larise, Dunja (2015). "The Islamic Community in Bosnia and Herzegovina and nation building by muslims/Bosniaks in the Western Balkans". Nationalities Papers. 43 (2): 195–212. doi:10.1080/00905992.2014.998186. S2CID 128622843.
- Lopasic, Alexander (1981). "Bosnian muslims: a search for identity". Bulletin. 8 (2): 115–125. doi:10.1080/13530198108705319.
- Lomonosov, Matvey (2012). "Illyrianism in Bosnian style: Balkan antiquity in contemporary national mythology and identity construction among the Bosniaks" (PDF). The South Slav Journal. 31 (3–4): 61–83.
- Moačanin, Nenad (2013). "Stanovništvo Bosanskog ejaleta u 18. stoljeću prema popisima glavarine" [The population of the Bosnia Eyalet in the 18th century based on the head tax]. Rad Hrvatske akademije znanosti i umjetnosti. Razred za društvene znanosti (in Croatian) (516): 95–120.
- Mrdjen, Snježana (2002). "Narodnost u popisima. Promjenjiva ili stalna kategorija" [Nationality in censuses. A shifting or a permanent category]. Stanovništvo (in Croatian) (1–4): 77–104.
- Ramčilović, Zećir (2019). "Demografske promjene nakon Berlinskog kongresa (1878) u Bosni i Hercegovini" [Demographic changes in Bosnia and Herzegovina after the Congress of Berlin (1878)]. Historijski Pregledi (in Bosnian). Tuzla: Centar za istraživanje moderne i savremene historije Tuzla.
- Ramet, Pedro (1985). "Primordial ethnicity or modern nationalism: The case of Yugoslavia's Muslims". Nationalities Papers. 13 (2): 165–187. doi:10.1080/00905998508408020. S2CID 162161893.
