= Abdullah Bosnevi =

Abdullah Bosnevi (1584–1644) was a Bosnian Malamati Sufi and poet who lived in the Ottoman period.

== Life ==
Bosnevi was born in Bosnia. After receiving his education there, he went to Istanbul, where he studied Islamic theology with Ottoman scholars. Because of his interest in Sufism, he traveled to Bursa, another Ottoman city, where he became a murid of Shaykh Hasan Kabadüz, a Malamati Sufi leader.

Bosnevi was influenced by the noted Sufi scholar Ibn Arabi, his most prominent work being his commentary on Ibn Arabi's work Fusus al Hikam. Bosnevi wrote books and tracts to spread information about Malamati Sufism and Wahdat al-Wujud Sufi metaphysics throughout North Africa. His tracts concerned Islamic mysticism, theology and commentary on Quranic verses.

He died in Konya, and was buried next to Sadr al-Din al-Qunawi.

== See also ==
- Sufi metaphysics
