= Srećko Matko Džaja =

German historian

Srećko Matko Džaja (born 29 October 1935) is a German historian who specialises in the history of Bosnia and Herzegovina and former Yugoslavia.

== Biography ==
Džaja was born in Gornji Malovan near Kupres. He finished elementary school in 1947 in Dolac, Travnik and attended gymnasiums in Livno (1947–48), Dubrovnik (1948–49) and Visoko (1949–56), where he graduated. As an apprentice of the Franciscan Province of Bosnia he spent a year in a novitiate from 1953 to 1954 in Kraljeva Sutjeska. Afterwards, Džaja studied theology at the Franciscan Theology in Sarajevo from 1956 to 1960. His education was disrupted due to military service in the Yugoslav People's Army in Leskovac, Serbia from 1960 to 1962. After serving in the army, he returned to school and graduated in 1963. He went to post-graduate studies in theology at the Catholic Faculty of Theology, University of Zagreb from 1963 to 1965. There, he earned his Ph.D. in 1971 with a thesis on Bosnian-Herzegovinian Catholics on the verge of the 18th to 19th century. In the meantime, from 1965 to 1971, Džaja was a docent at the Franciscan Theology in Sarajevo, and after earning the Ph.D. in 1971, he was promoted to a rector of the said school in 1973 and held that post till 1975.

In 1975, Džaja left the Franciscan order and the professorship and went to West Germany where he enrolled in LMU Munich to study history, political philosophy, and Slavic philology. There, he earned a Ph.D. in 1983 with a thesis on Bosnian-Herzegovinian confessionalism between the years 1463 to 1804. He received an award from the German South European Society (Südosteuropa – Gesellschaft) for his second Ph.D. From 1976, Džaja was a stipend of several notable German foundations, Alexander von Humboldt Foundation, Volkswagen Foundation and German Research Foundation, which financed his projects, which were successfully undertaken by Džaja as an associate of the Institute for History of Southern and Eastern Europe (Institut für Geschichte Osteuropas und Südosteuropas) of LMU Munich and the German South European Society.

Džaja acquired German citizenship in 1994 and is a member of the Society of Eastern European Historians. He retired in 2000 and lives in Munich. Since 2002 he is a member of the Academy of Sciences and Arts of Bosnia and Herzegovina.

== Works ==
Džaja's published works include:

- Katolici u Bosni i zapadnoj Hercegovini na prijelazu iz 18. u 19. stoljeće [Catholics in Bosnia and Western Herzegovina at the verge of 18th to 19th century] (in Croatian). 1971.
- Konfessionalität und Nationalität Bosniens und der Herzegowina [Confession and Nationality in Bosnia and Herzegovina] (in German). 1984.
- Bosnien-Herzegowina in der oesterreichisch-ungarischen Epoche [Bosnia and Herzegovina in the Austrian-Hungarian Epcoh] (in German). 1994.
- Austro-Turcica 1541–1552: diplomatische Akten des habsburgischen Gesandtschaftsverkehrs mit der Hohen Pforte im Zeitalter Süleymans des Prächtigen [Austro-Turcica 1541-1552: the diplomatic acts of the Habsburg embassy with the High Port in the era of Suleiman the Magnificent] (in German). 1995.
- Politička realnost jugoslavenstva: (1918-1991): s posebnim osvrtom na Bosnu i Hercegovinu [The political reality of Yugoslavism (1918-1991) with special observation in Bosnia and Herzegovina] (in Croatian). 2004.
