= Cvetan =

Cvetan is a South Slavic masculine given name. Feminine forms: Cvetana, Cvetanka.

- Cvetan Čurlinov, Macedonian footballer
- Cvetan Grozdanov (1936–2018), Macedonian art historian

== See also ==
- Cvitan
- Cvijan
