= Croats of Bosnia and Herzegovina =

One of constituent ethnic groups in Bosnia and Herzegovina

Hrvati Bosne i Hercegovine (Croatian)
- Flag of the Croatian Republic of Herzeg-Bosnia, today used as an ethnic flag

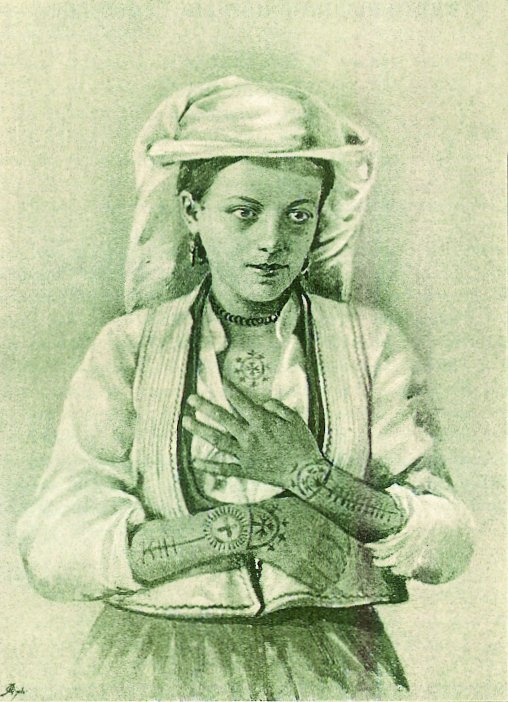
- Croat woman with traditional Catholic tattoos

Total population
- 544,780 (2013)

Regions with significant populations
- Bosnia and Herzegovina
- Herzegovina-Neretva Canton: 118,297
- Central Bosnia Canton: 97,629
- West Herzegovina Canton: 93,725
- Canton 10: 64,604
- Zenica-Doboj Canton: 43,819
- Posavina Canton: 33,600
- Republika Srpska: 29,645
- Tuzla Canton: 23,592
- Sarajevo Canton: 17,520
- Brčko District: 17,252
- Una-Sana Canton: 5,073
- Bosnian-Podrinje Canton Goražde: 24

Languages
- Croatian

Religion
- Christianity (Catholic Church)

Related ethnic groups
- Croats

The Croats of Bosnia and Herzegovina (Croatian: Hrvati Bosne i Hercegovine), often referred to as Bosnian Croats (bosanski Hrvati) or Herzegovinian Croats (hercegovački Hrvati), are native to Bosnia and Herzegovina and constitute the third most populous ethnic group, after Bosniaks and Serbs. They are one of the three constitutive nations of Bosnia and Herzegovina. Most Croats identify themselves as Catholics and speak Croatian. The 2013 population census in Bosnia and Herzegovina recorded 544,780 residents registering as of Croat ethnicity.

Croats have been present in Bosnia and Herzegovina since the Slavic migrations to the Balkans in the 7th century and have been associated with Western Christianity. They lived in regions that were part of the Kingdom of Croatia under native rulers and, later, in personal union with Hungary, encompassing large parts of Bosnia and Herzegovina in the west until the 16th century. The Croats also lived under the Kingdom of Bosnia until it fell to the Ottoman Empire in the second half of the 15th century. Between the 15th and 19th centuries, the Croats as Catholics were a special confessional community within the Ottoman Bosnia and Herzegovina. Although the majority were serfs, they dominated the trade, while the Bosnian Franciscans, the only surviving remnant of the medieval Bosnian kingdom, were the leading cultural and educational institution. However, the Catholics were often persecuted by the Ottomans, prompting many to flee the area, especially during the Great Turkish War and the Morean War in the second half of the 17th century, when their status diminished and their numbers were reduced to 30,000. At the end of the 17th century and in the early 18th century, the number of Catholics began to increase, with many of those who had fled returning.

In the second half of the 19th century, especially during the Austro-Hungarian rule in Bosnia and Herzegovina, the Croats became active political subjects, participating in Croatian national revival and developing their own modern political, cultural and educational institutions. After World War I, the Croats of Bosnia and Herzegovina became part of the Kingdom of Serbs, Croats and Slovenes, later Yugoslavia. During the World War II, Bosnia and Herzegovina was incorporated into the Independent State of Croatia. Following 1945, Croats were recognised as one of the constituent peoples of the Socialist Republic of Bosnia and Herzegovina within socialist Yugoslavia. During the dissolution of Yugoslavia and the Bosnian War of the 1990s, Croat political and military institutions, including the Croatian Republic of Herzeg-Bosnia and its military force, the Croatian Defence Council (HVO), played a significant role in the conflict and in the establishment of the Federation of Bosnia and Herzegovina. Today, Croats remain one of the three constituent peoples of Bosnia and Herzegovina.

== History ==
=== Early Middle Ages ===
Medieval Croatian state (orange) included western parts of the present-day Bosnia and Herzegovina

The dating of the presence of the Croats – in the sense of a modern ethnic identity – since the early medieval times in all territories of present-day Bosnia and Herzegovina is a matter of dispute among historians due to its anachronism.

The exact date of the Croats' arrival in the territories of present-day Bosnia and Herzegovina is a matter of dispute among historians. Ivo Goldstein, Neven Budak and Mladen Ančić, the leading Croatian medievalists, support different views. Goldstein follows the mainstream theory and shares views of Bogo Grafenauer and Božidar Ferjančić that the Croats settled in the 7th century and conquered Dalmatia in a war against the Pannonian Avars, leaning mainly on the De Administrando Imperio, a 10th-century work of the Byzantine Emperor Constantine VII. Ančić, siding with the late-migration theory exposed by Lujo Margetić, dates the arrival of Croats between the late 8th and early 9th century. Budak's view is that the Croats originally formed as a social elite within the Avar Khaganate, with the Slavic element being the most important.

John Van Antwerp Fine Jr. and Noel Malcolm believe that the westernmost parts of modern-day Bosnia and Herzegovina were part of the Duchy of Croatia, while the easternmost parts were part of the Principality of Serbia. According to The New Cambridge Medieval History, "at the beginning of the eleventh century, the Croats lived in two more or less clearly defined regions" of the "Croatian lands" which "were now divided into three districts" including Slavonia/Pannonian Croatia (between rivers Sava and Drava) on one side and Croatia/Dalmatian littoral (between Gulf of Kvarner and rivers Vrbas and Neretva) and Bosnia (around river Bosna) on other side.

=== High and late Middle Ages ===
In 1102, Croatia entered into a union with the Kingdom of Hungary. After this, Bosnia, which was previously part of the Kingdom of Croatia, began to disassociate itself from Croatia. At first, Bosnia became a separate principality under Ban Kulin, who managed to solidify Bosnian autonomy at the expense of more powerful neighbours. Still, it was only in the 14th century that Bosnia became a formidable state. In the 14th century, King Tvrtko I conquered part of western Serbia and later parts of the Kingdom of Croatia, which he accomplished by defeating various Croatian nobles and supporting Hungary. Thus, the Kingdom of Bosnia emerged, but part of the present territory of Bosnia and Herzegovina remained in the Kingdom of Croatia.

Regarding culture and religion, Bosnia was closer to Croatia than the Orthodox lands to the east. The Diocese of Bosnia is mentioned as Catholic in the 11th century and later fell under the jurisdiction of the Croatian Archdiocese of Split. In the 12th century, it came under the jurisdiction of the Diocese of Dubrovnik. Another connection between Bosnia with Croatia is that Bosnian rulers always used the political title "Ban Kulin" in similarity to their Croatian counterparts. Due to the scarcity of historical records, no definite figures dealing with the religious composition of medieval Bosnia exist. However, some Croatian scholars suggest that a majority of Bosnia's medieval population were Catholics, who, according to Zlopaša, accounted for 700,000 of the total Bosnian population of 900,000. Some 100,000 were members of the Bosnian Church and other 100,000 were Eastern Orthodox Christians.

=== Ottoman Empire ===
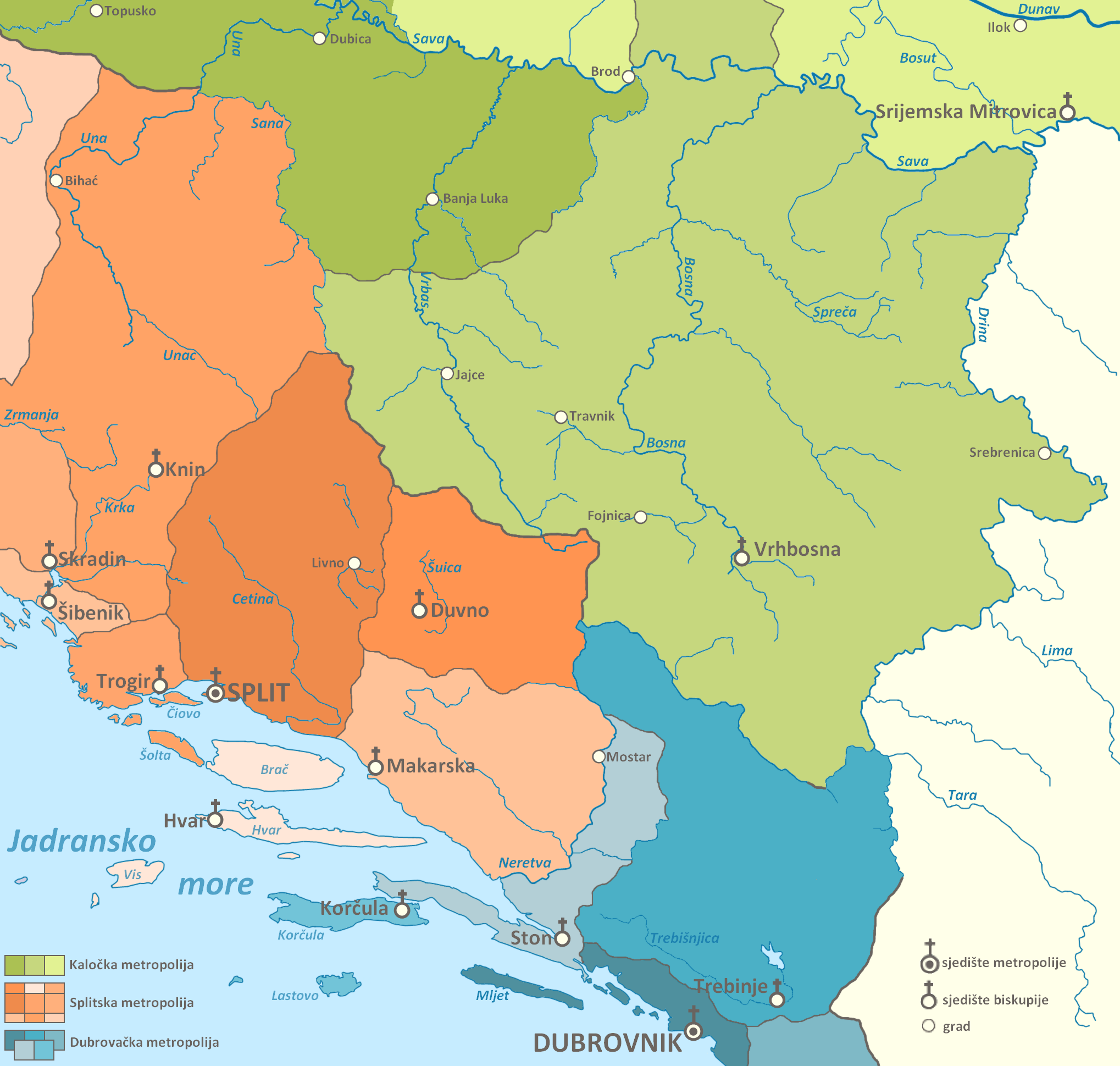
Catholic Dioceses in the 15th century covering the territory of the present-day Bosnia and Herzegovina

In the mid-15th century, the Ottoman Empire began to conquer Bosnia. In 1451, they took the Vrhbosna province, and in 1463, they conquered Bosnia. Herzegovina was conquered in 1481, while northern Bosnia remained under Hungarian and Croatian rule until 1527, when the Ottomans took control. After the Turkish conquest, many Catholics in Bosnia converted to Islam, and their numbers in some areas declined as many fled due to fear of conversion and persecution. The Ottoman conquest changed the demographics of Bosnia and Herzegovina, reducing the Catholic population. The present-day boundaries of Bosnia and Herzegovina were established in 1699 with the Treaty of Karlowitz, which ended the Austro-Ottoman War. Another significant event for the Croats of Bosnia and Herzegovina is the boundary established by an agreement between the Republic of Ragusa and the Ottoman Empire, under which Ragusans promised to cede a part of their territory in Neum to the Ottomans to protect themselves from the Republic of Venice.

In 1624, Pjetër Mazreku estimated the population of Bosnia, excluding Herzegovina and the Adriatic Hinterland. This estimate was revised by Nenad Moačanin, a historian, in 2013, numbering 225,000 Muslims (50%), 150,000 Eastern Orthodox Christians (33.3%), and 75,000 Catholics (16.7%). Bishop Marijan Maravić, who governed the Diocese of Bosnia, which covered most of the Bosnian region, recorded 75,196 Catholics in his jurisdiction in 1650, while his successor Bishop Nikola Ogramić Olovčić estimated the number of Catholics in the Diocese in 1675 to be 80,000.

The Ottomans launched a war against the Habsburg Monarchy to conquer Vienna, triggering the Great Turkish War (1683–1699). This conflict proved disastrous for the Catholic population of northern and central Bosnia, whose numbers sharply declined. The 1697 campaign of Prince Eugene of Savoy had the most devastating impact: he ordered the destruction of Ottoman property, prompting nearly 40,000 Christians, the majority of whom were Catholics and mostly from northern, but also from central Bosnia, to flee with his forces to the Catholic-held Slavonia in fear of Ottoman reprisals.

After the successful defence of Vienna (1683), Christians in Dalmatia, Herzegovina, and Bosnia rose against Ottoman rule, plundering Ottoman estates and forcing garrisons into their forts. Supported by Venetian arms and supplies, local hajduks raided Ottoman lands. Allied with the Habsburgs, Venice opened the Morean War (1684–1699), which spread into Dalmatia, Herzegovina, and western Bosnia. The war caused major migrations from Herzegovina, west Bosnia, and Dalmatia to the reconquered territories, where the Venetians resettled refugees and recruited them as soldiers, offering land and tax exemptions. By the war's end, more than 30,000 Christians, both Catholic and Eastern Orthodox, had migrated to Dalmatia.

During these two wars, two-thirds of Catholics emigrated outside of Bosnia and Herzegovina, or around 70,000 people. The total Catholic population of Bosnia and western Herzegovina fell to around 30,000, and in eastern Herzegovina to only 2,200.

Up until the end of the 17th century, the Catholics, along with Jews, were the leading merchant class of the Ottoman Bosnia and Herzegovina, mainly due to their good standing with the Republic of Ragusa in the south. The wars at the end of the 17th century brought demographic, social and urban catastrophe to the Catholics, with their merchant class almost completely disappearing. Their place as a leading merchant class was taken by the Eastern Orthodox Christians in the 18th century, including Serbs, Greeks and Armenians.

After the Treaty of Karlowitz in 1699, the number of Catholics in Bosnia and Herzegovina started to recover in the first half of the 18th century. Numerous families that left during the war returned, both from Dalmatia and Slavonia. The return was encouraged by the Ottoman authorities, giving the returnees amnesty with abandoned lands, free tools and seed. The recovery was much more rapid in Bosnia and western Herzegovina, the area served by the Franciscans. The return from Dalmatia to southwestern Bosnia and western Herzegovina became more rapid after the 1733 plague, when the local Muslim landlords stimulated their return. The growth was affected mainly by natural growth, and less by migrations. The bishop of Bosnia Mato Delivić didn't manage to record all areas under his jurisdiction due to the Austro-Turkish war in 1737. That year, he collected the data from western and central Bosnia and reported 16,504 Catholics. His successors conducted a census of the entire jurisdiction and recorded 39,942 Catholics in 1743. The recovery process was especially slow in eastern Herzegovina. The bishop of Trebinje Antonio Righi, reported in 1708, that there were only 2,200 Catholics in his diocese, which covered the area. His successor, Sigismund Tudišić, noted that in 1751, there were 3,009 Catholics. Only a century later, in 1858, the number of Catholics rose to 8,760.

The census shows that there were around 40,000 Catholics in Bosnia and western Herzegovina in the 1740s. The impactful events for their demography at the time were the Austro-Turkish War (1737-1739) and the epidemic of 1742-43. In the next sixty years, the number of Catholics rose to around 100,000, an increase of 60,000 or 150%, with an average annual growth of 2,5%. The decrease between the 1780 and 1786 censuses was due to the 1782-83 epidemic. This epidemic spread throughout Bosnia and Herzegovina and killed around 20,000 Catholics and 100,000 other residents. The continued growth of the Catholics in the second half of the 18th century is mainly due to peace between the Ottoman Empire and its Christian neighbours. The last Austro-Turkish War (1788–1791) was brief and didn't impact the demography of the Catholics in Bosnia and Herzegovina.

The increase in the number of Catholics was primarily due to natural growth, rather than immigration from Dalmatia, which occurred at the end of the 18th and the beginning of the 19th century as a result of the Napoleonic conquest. There were also minor occasions of emigration of Catholics to the Austrian-held territory.

Catholics on the territory of the Apostolic Vicariate of Bosnia (Bosnian region and western Herzegovina)
Year	Persons	Households
1743	39,942	4,920
1762	58,804	6,812
1768	60,061	7,128
1776	73,053	8,661
1779	76,737	8,771
1786	68,052	9,029
1798	82,422	11,177
1801	90,547	11,946
1806	98,932	13,864

The 1851 census counted only males, recording 440,733 in Ottoman Bosnia and Herzegovina. Historian Muhamed Hadžijahić concluded, based on the 1851 census, that the total population was approximately 1,077,956, including 173,200 Catholics (16.07%). The 1870 Ottoman census recorded 220,353 Catholics in the Eyalet of Bosnia (excluding the Sanjak of Novi Pazar), an increase of 27.2% from 1851, making up 14.6% of the population.

Catholics in the Ottoman Bosnia and Herzegovina
Year	Persons	%	Total population
1851	173,200	16.07%	1,077,956
1870	220,353	14.59%	1,510,307

The Ottoman authorities waged between the two Christian churches, the Catholic Church and the Eastern Orthodox Church, by giving the bishops of the Eastern Orthodox Church the right to collect taxes from Catholics, and then granting appeals to Catholics to this decision.

The activity of the Catholic Church was limited. At the same time, the Ottomans preferred the Orthodox Church because Catholicism was the faith of Austria, their enemy. In contrast, Eastern Orthodoxy was more prevalent in Bosnia, making it more acceptable to the Ottomans. In the first 50 years of Ottoman rule, many Catholics fled from Bosnia. A number of Catholics also converted to Orthodox Christianity. Franciscans were the only Catholic priests to be active in Bosnia. Before the Ottomans arrived in Bosnia, there were 35 Franciscan monasteries in Bosnia and four in Herzegovina. Some monasteries were destroyed, and some were converted to mosques. In the 1680s there were only 10 Franciscan monasteries left in Bosnia. The Catholic Church in Bosnia divided its administration into two dioceses, one was the Croatian Bosnia diocese, the part which the Ottomans did not conquer, and the other was Bosna Srebrena diocese.

Between 1516 and 1524, the persecution and forced Islamization of Catholics occurred in Bosnia and Herzegovina. In that year, Franciscan monasteries in Kraljeva Sutjeska, Visoko, Fojnica, Kreševo and Konjic, and later in Mostar. It is believed that during that time, some 100,000 Croats converted to Islam. In 1528, the Ottomans conquered Jajce and Banja Luka, thus destroying the Croatian defence line on the Vrbas river. After that conquest, Croatia reduced to around 37,000 km^{2}. During the 18th century, Turkish rule in Bosnia and Herzegovina started to weaken, and after the Napoleonic Wars their rule rapidly decreased; the Ottoman Empire lost its demographic, civilisation, and other reserves for military and territorial expansion, while the Austrian Empire, as the rest of the European countries, gained them.

The Catholics were also under pressure from the Eastern Orthodox Church between 1498 and 1779. The Eastern Orthodox Church gained the right from the Ottoman government to collect taxes from both the Catholics and the Eastern Orthodox Christians. The Eastern Orthodox bishops claimed before the Ottoman authorities that Catholicism and Eastern Orthodoxy are the same religion to gain jurisdiction over the Catholics. Together with taxing the Catholics, the Eastern Orthodox clergy also insisted on the conversion of Catholics to Eastern Orthodoxy, especially in Eastern Herzegovina.

From 1815 to 1878, Ottoman authority in Bosnia and Herzegovina declined. After the reorganisation of the Ottoman army and the abolition of the Janissaries, the Bosnian nobility revolted, led by Husein Gradaščević, who sought to establish autonomy in Bosnia and Herzegovina and halt any further social reforms. During the 19th century, various reforms were implemented to increase freedom of religion, which exacerbated tensions between Catholics and Muslims in Bosnia and Herzegovina. Soon, economic decay would occur, and nationalist influence from Europe would arrive in Bosnia and Herzegovina. Since the state administration was very disorganised and the national conscience was powerful among the Christian population, the Ottoman Empire lost control over Bosnia and Herzegovina. On 19 June 1875, Catholic Croats, led by Don Ivan Musić, revolted because of high taxes in West Herzegovina. Their goal was to subordinate Bosnia to the rule of the Emperor of Austria, who was also the King of Croatia. During the revolt, for the first time, Bosnian Croats used the Croatian flag. Soon after, the Orthodox population in East Herzegovina also revolted, which led to the Herzegovina Uprising. The Ottoman authorities were unable to defeat the rebels, so Serbia and Montenegro took advantage of this weakness and attacked the Ottoman Empire in 1876, soon after the Russian Empire did the same. The Turks lost the war in 1878, and this resulted in over 150,000 refugees who went to Croatia. After the Congress of Berlin was held in the same year, Bosnia and Herzegovina was transferred to the Austro-Hungarian Empire.

=== Austria-Hungary ===
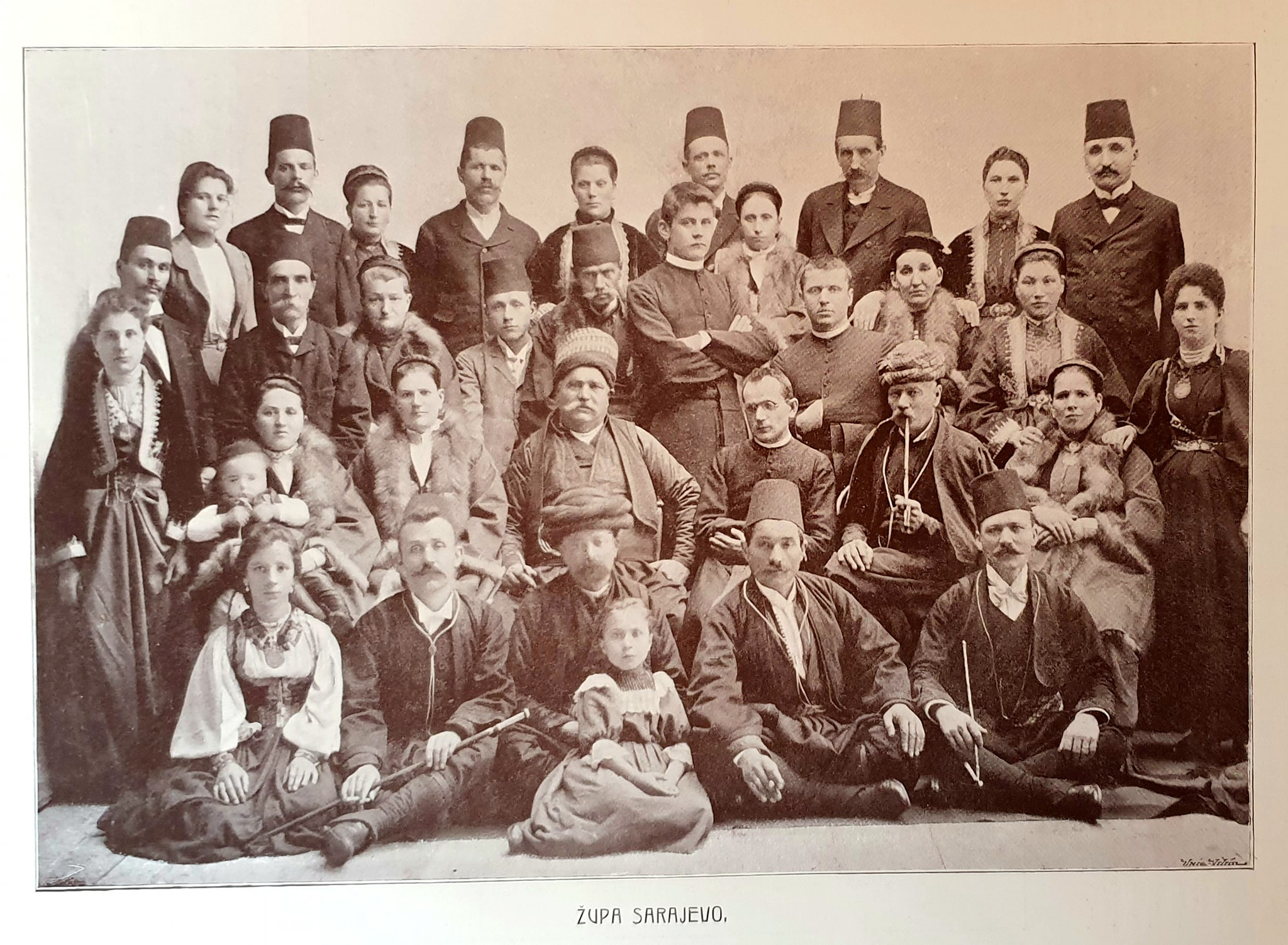
Croats of Sarajevo with their priest, ca. 1900

During Austro-Hungarian rule in Bosnia and Herzegovina (1878–1918), the number of Croats gradually increased, mainly through natural growth, with additional support from approximately 38,000 Croats who immigrated from present-day Croatia between 1878 and 1910. According to the Croatian author Vjekoslav Klaić, in 1878 there were 646,678 Eastern Orthodox Christians (48.4%, mostly ethnic Serbs), 480,596 Muslims (35.9%), 207,199 Latin Catholics (15.5%, mostly ethnic Croats), and about 3,000 Jews (0.2%).

According to the 1910 census, there were 434,061 Latin Catholics, of whom 390,009 declared Serbo-Croatian as their native language (i.e., ethnic Croats); the remainder were Germans, Poles, Czechs, Slovaks, Hungarians, and others. By 1910, 114,591 immigrants had settled in Bosnia and Herzegovina. The immigrants' religious and ethnic backgrounds were heterogeneous.

Ethnic totals and percentages
Year	Catholics (Note: Refers to the Latin Catholics, not Eastern Catholics who were also present during the Austrian-Hungarian rule, and includes different ethnicities that migrated to Bosnia and Herzegovina, mainly after 1885, not just Croats.)	%	Total population
1879	209,391	18.08%	1,158,440
1885	265,788	19.89%	1,336,091
1895	334,142 (Note: Larger immigrations of Catholics of different ethnic backgrounds after 1885 contributed to the increase.)	21.31%	1,568,092
1910	434,061 (Note: Of those, 390,009 were native speakers of Serbo-Croatian, i.e., ethnic Croats.)	22.87%	1,898,044
Official Population Census Results

Even after the fall of Ottoman rule, the population of Bosnia and Herzegovina was divided. In the Habsburg Kingdom of Croatia, Croatian politicians strived for the unification of the Kingdom of Dalmatia with Croatia. Another ambition of Croatian politicians was to incorporate the Condominium of Bosnia and Herzegovina into the Kingdom of Croatia. The Habsburg Governor Béni Kállay resorted to co-opting religious institutions. Soon, the Austrian Emperor gained support to appoint Eastern Orthodox metropolitans and Catholic bishops, as well as to select the Muslim hierarchy. The first Catholic archbishop was Josip Stadler. Both apostolic vicariates, Bosnian and Herzegovinian, were abolished, and instead, three dioceses were founded; Vrhbosna diocese with a seat in Sarajevo, Banja Luka diocese with a seat in Banja Luka and Mostar-Duvno diocese with a seat in Mostar.

At the time, Bosnia and Herzegovina were facing a Habsburg attempt at modernisation. There were 1.1 million inhabitants in Bosnia and Herzegovina; the majority were Croats, Serbs, and Muslims, with smaller percentages of Slovenes, Czechs, and others. During this period, the most significant event is the Bosnian entry into European political life and the shaping of ethnic Croats in Bosnia and Herzegovina into a modern nation. At the end of the 19th century, Bosnian Croats established various reading, cultural, and singing societies. By the beginning of the 20th century, a new Bosnian Croat intelligentsia had emerged, playing a significant role in the political life of Croats. The Croatian Support Society for Needs of Students of Middle Schools and High Schools in Bosnia and Herzegovina was founded in 1902, and in 1907 it was merged with the Croatian Society for Education of Children in Craft and Trade, also founded in 1902, into Croatian Cultural Society Napredak (Progress). Napredak educated and gave scholarships to more than 20,000 students. Students of Napredak were not only Bosnian Croats but also Croats from other regions.

Kállay attempted to unify all Bosnians into a single nation of Bosniaks, but he failed to do so after Bosnians established their national political parties. Before the annexation of Bosnia and Herzegovina in 1908, the Croat People's Union (HNZ) became a political party; its ideology was very similar to that of the Croatian-Serbian Coalition in Croatia. In 1909, Stadler opposed such a policy and founded a new political party, the Croat Catholic Association (HKU), an opponent of the secular HNZ. HKU emphasised clerical ideals and religious exclusivity. However, Bosnian Croats mostly supported the secular nationalist policy of the HNZ. HNZ and the Muslim Nation Organisation formed a coalition that ruled the country from 1911 until the dissolution of the Bosnian parliament in 1914.

=== Kingdom of Yugoslavia ===
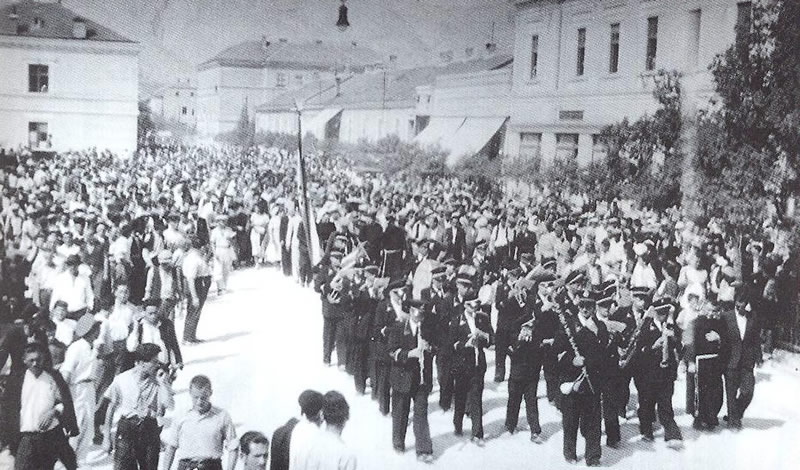
People gathered waiting for Stjepan Radić to arrive in Mostar in 1925

After World War I, Bosnia and Herzegovina became part of the internationally unrecognised State of Slovenes, Croats and Serbs, which existed between October and December 1918. In December 1918, this state united with the Kingdom of Serbia as the Kingdom of Serbs, Croats and Slovenes,which was renamed the Kingdom of Yugoslavia in 1929. This new state was characterized by Serbian nationalism, and was a form of "Greater Serbia". Serbs held control over the armed forces and the state's politics. With around 40% of Serbs living in Bosnia and Herzegovina, the Serbian leadership of the state wanted to implement a Serbian hegemony in this region. Bosnian Croats constituted around a quarter of the total Bosnian population, but they did not have a single municipality president. The regime of the Kingdom of Yugoslavia was characterized by limited parliamentarian, drastic elective manipulations and later King Alexander's 6 January Dictatorship, state robbery present outside Serbia and political killings (Milan Šufflay, Ivo Pilar) and corruption. Yugoslavia was preoccupied with political struggles, which led to the collapse of the state after Dušan Simović organized a coup in March 1941 and after which Nazi Germany invaded Yugoslavia.

King Alexander was killed in 1934, which led to the end of the dictatorship. In 1939, faced with killings, corruption scandals, violence, and the failure of centralised policy, the Serbian leadership agreed on a compromise with the Croats. On 24 August 1939, the president of the Croatian Peasant Party, Vladko Maček and Dragiša Cvetković made an agreement (Cvetković-Maček agreement) according to which Banovina of Croatia was created on territory of Sava and Littoral Banovina and on districts of Dubrovnik, Šid, Brčko, Ilok, Gradačac, Derventa, Travnik and Fojnica. Around 30% of the present-day territory of Bosnia and Herzegovina became part of the Banovina of Croatia. Those parts had a Croatian majority. The creation of the Banovina of Croatia was one of the solutions to the "Croatian issue".

=== World War II ===
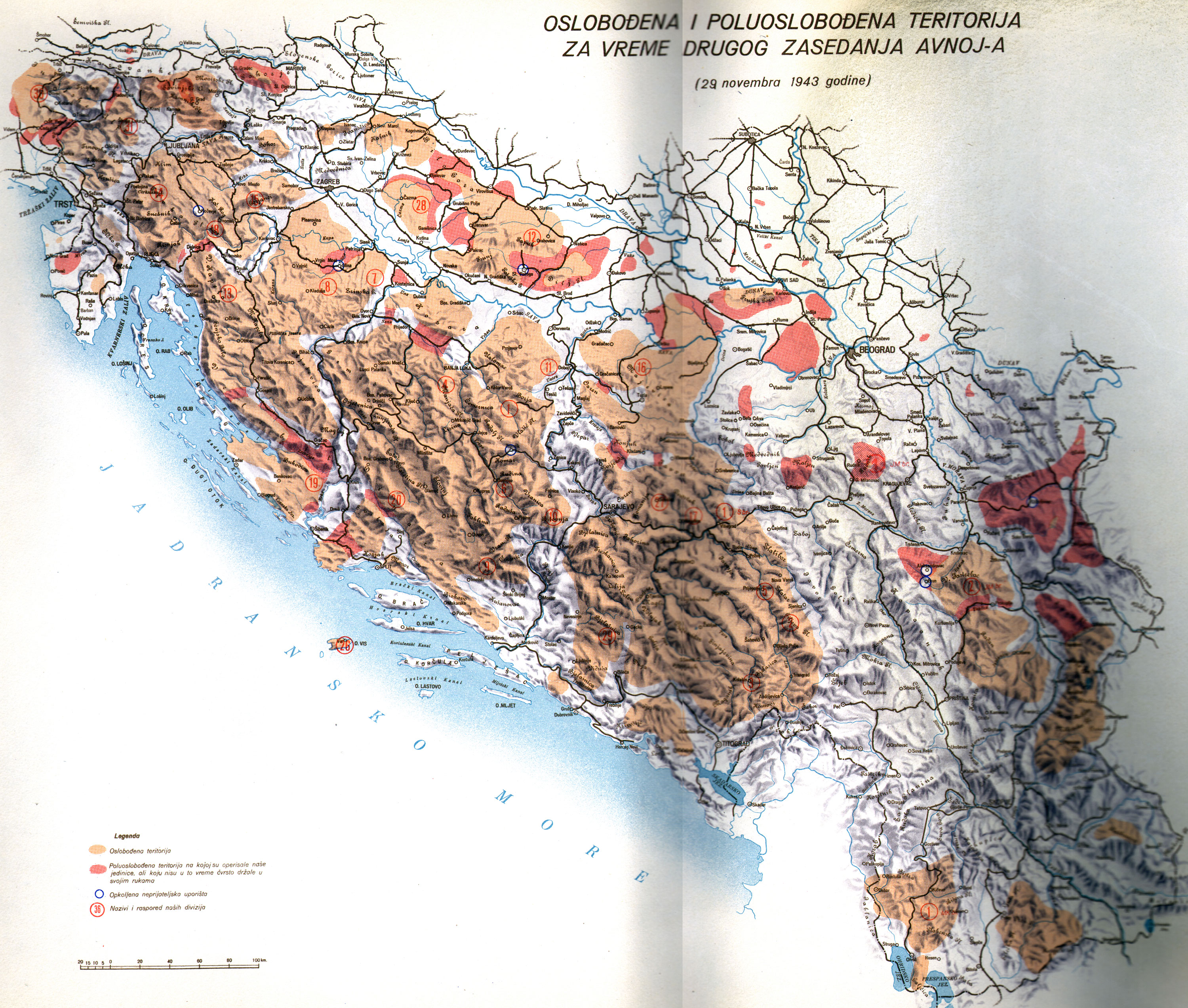
Territory under the control of Yugoslav Partisans in November 1943

After the collapse of Yugoslavia amidst German and Italian invasion in April 1941, the Axis puppet state, which encompassed the entire Bosnia and Herzegovina, Independent State of Croatia (NDH) under the radical Croatian nationalist Ustaše regime was established. The Bosnian Croats were divided, with some supporting the NDH, and others actively opposing it by joining or supporting the Yugoslav Partisans. In contrast, others chose to wait, not attracted to either the fascist Ustaše or the communist-led resistance. After the Ustaše campaign of genocide and terror, targeting Serbs, Jews, and Roma, a brutal civil war ensued. At the same time, a parallel genocide against Croats and Bosniaks was carried out by the Yugoslav Royalist and Serbian nationalist Chetniks. The Ustaše regime also persecuted any opponents or dissidents among Bosnian Croats, especially communists, pre-war members of the now-banned Croatian Peasant Party, and those connected with the partisan resistance. The Ustaše executed many Bosnian Croats, for instance, resistance fighters and supporters Jakov Dugandžić, Mostar's Ljubo Brešan and 19-year old Mostar gymnasium student Ante Zuanić, as well as a prominent Mostar CPP member Blaž Slišković (in Jasenovac concentration camp). Prominent Croat communist intellectual from Bosnia, Ognjen Prica, was shot by Ustaše in Kerestinec prison. Families of Bosnian Croats who left to join the partisan resistance were usually interned or sent to concentration camps by Ustaše authorities.

Numerous Bosnian Croats joined the partisan movement, fighting against the Axis forces and the Ustaše regime. Some of them included people's heroes such as Franjo Kluz, Ivan Marković Irac, Stipe Đerek, Karlo Batko, Ante Šarić "Rade Španac", and others. From the very beginning of the uprising against the Axis, many Bosnian Croats became commanders of partisan units (e.g., Josip Mažar-Šoša, Ivica Marušić-Ratko etc.), even though the units themselves were predominantly composed of Serbs. The territory that partisans liberated and managed to keep under their control from November 1942 to January 1943 (dubbed the Republic of Bihać) included all of rural Western Herzegovina west of Neretva and Široki Brijeg, including Livno. Livno and its area, under partisan control from August to October 1942, was very important for Bosnian Croat resistance, as key CPP members Florijan Sučić and Ivan Pelivan joined the resistance and mobilized many other Croats. Bosnian Croats' representatives, among which Mostar lawyer Cvitan Spužević, also actively participated in the provisional assembly of the country, ZAVNOBiH (State Anti-fascist Council for the National Liberation of Bosnia and Herzegovina). ZAVNOBiH proclaimed the statehood of Bosnia-Herzegovina and the equality of Muslims, Croats, and Serbs in the country in its historic session in 1943. The first government of People's Republic of Bosnia and Herzegovina in 1945 included several prominent Croats - Jakov Grgurić (deputy prime minister), Cvitan Spužević (minister of construction), Ante Babić (education), and Ante Martinović (forestry).

After the partisans liberated most of Yugoslavia and the NDH collapsed in May 1945, some NDH soldiers and civilians retreated to the British-occupied zone in Austria. Many of them were killed in the Bleiburg repatriations. In the closing stages of the war and the immediate aftermath, some Bosnian Croats who previously supported the Ustaše regime or were merely perceived as potential opponents of the new communist Yugoslavia were persecuted or executed (notably, Herzegovina friars).

Total casualties and losses of Bosnian Croats in World War II and the aftermath are estimated at 64–79,000. According to the statistician Bogoljub Kočović, the relative war losses of Bosnian Croats, compared to their expected population in 1948, were 11.4%. According to the demographer Vladimir Žerjavić, 17,000 Bosnian Croats died in partisan ranks, 22,000 in NDH forces, while 25,000 lost their lives as civilians; of civilians, almost ¾ or 19,000 died as a result of Axis terror or in Ustaše concentration camps.

At the end of 1977, 8.8% of Bosnian recipients of veterans' pensions were Croats, while during WWII Croats composed around 23% of the country's population.

=== Socialist Yugoslavia ===
After the war, Bosnia and Herzegovina became one of the six constitutive republics of Socialist Yugoslavia. Intensive state campaigns of nationalisation of property, followed by industrialisation and urbanisation, variously affected Bosnian Croats. While some centres and areas prospered, other rural areas underwent depopulation and urban flight, as well as (most notably in western Herzegovina) high rates of emigration to the Western world.

Officeholders usually rotated among the three ethnic communities in Bosnia and Herzegovina. In the 1980s, many Bosnian Croat politicians held high positions, including Ante Marković, Branko Mikulić, and Mato Andrić.

=== Bosnian War ===
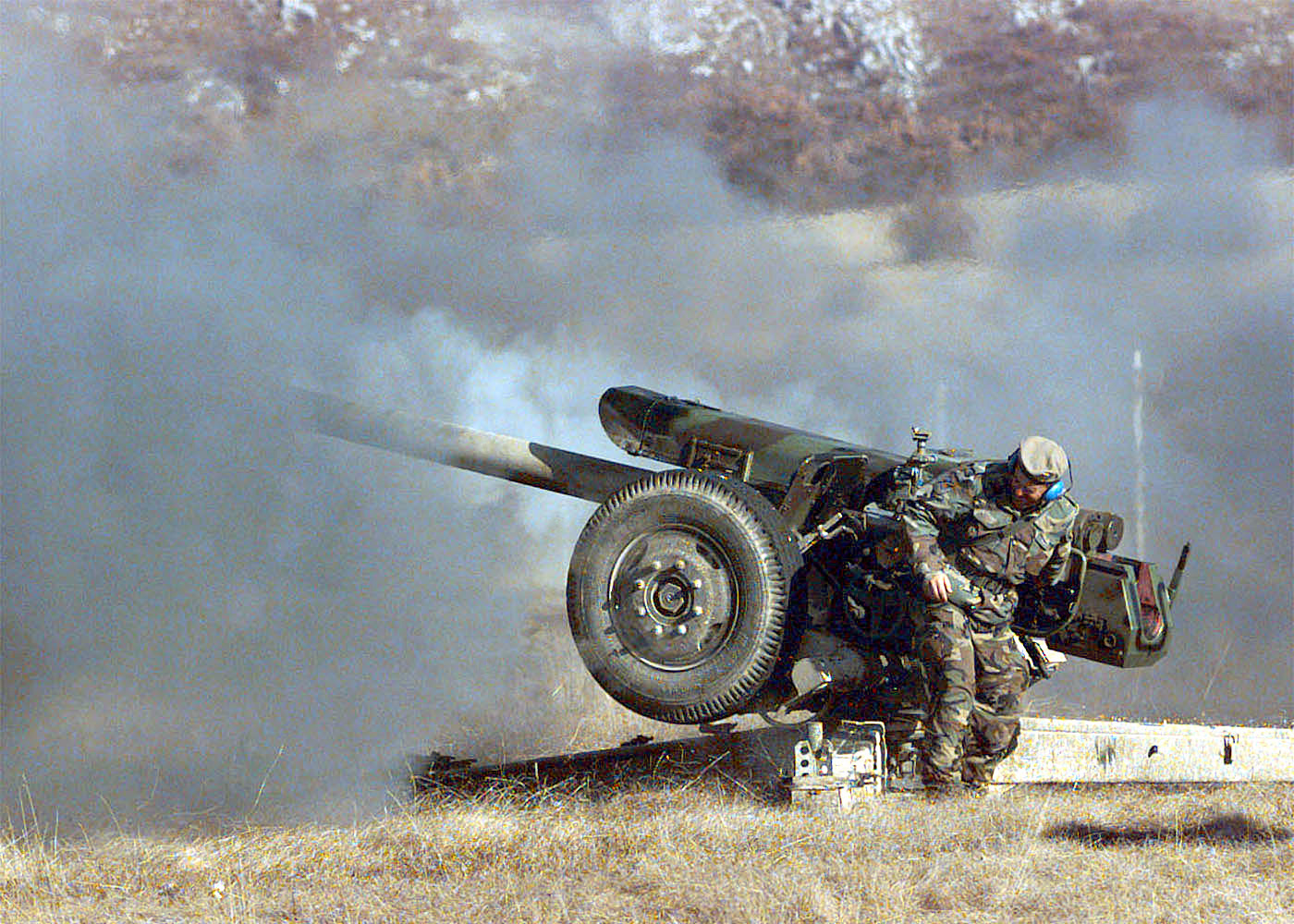
HVO soldier fires a 122mm Howitzer D-30J

Citizens of the Socialist Republic of Bosnia and Herzegovina voted for the independence of Bosnia and Herzegovina in the referendum, which was held between 29 February and 1 March 1992. The referendum question was: "Are you in favour of a sovereign and independent Bosnia-Herzegovina, a state of equal citizens and nations of Muslims, Serbs, Croats, and others who live in it?" Independence was strongly favoured by Muslim and Bosnian Croat voters, but the referendum was boycotted mainly by Bosnian Serbs. The total turnout of voters was 63.6% of which 99.7% voted for the independence of Bosnia and Herzegovina.

On 5 April 1992, Serb forces began the Siege of Sarajevo. On 12 May, Yugoslav People's Army left Bosnia and Herzegovina and left most of the arms to the Army of Republika Srpska, headed by Ratko Mladić. The first unit to oppose Serb forces in Bosnia and Herzegovina was the Croatian Defence Forces (HOS) founded by Croatian Party of Rights of Bosnia and Herzegovina on 18 December 1991. The Croatian Community of Herzeg-Bosnia established its own force, the Croatian Defence Council (HVO) on 8 April 1992. HVO consisted of 20 to 30% of Muslims who joined HVO because local Muslim militias were unable to arm themselves. The Croatian Community of Herzeg-Bosnia was founded on 18 November 1991 as a community of municipalities where the majority of the population was Croats. In its founding acts, Herzeg-Bosnia had no separatist character. The Croatian Republic of Herzeg-Bosnia was declared by the Bosnian Croat leadership as a temporary region, which, after the war ended, would again become part of a united Bosnia and Herzegovina.

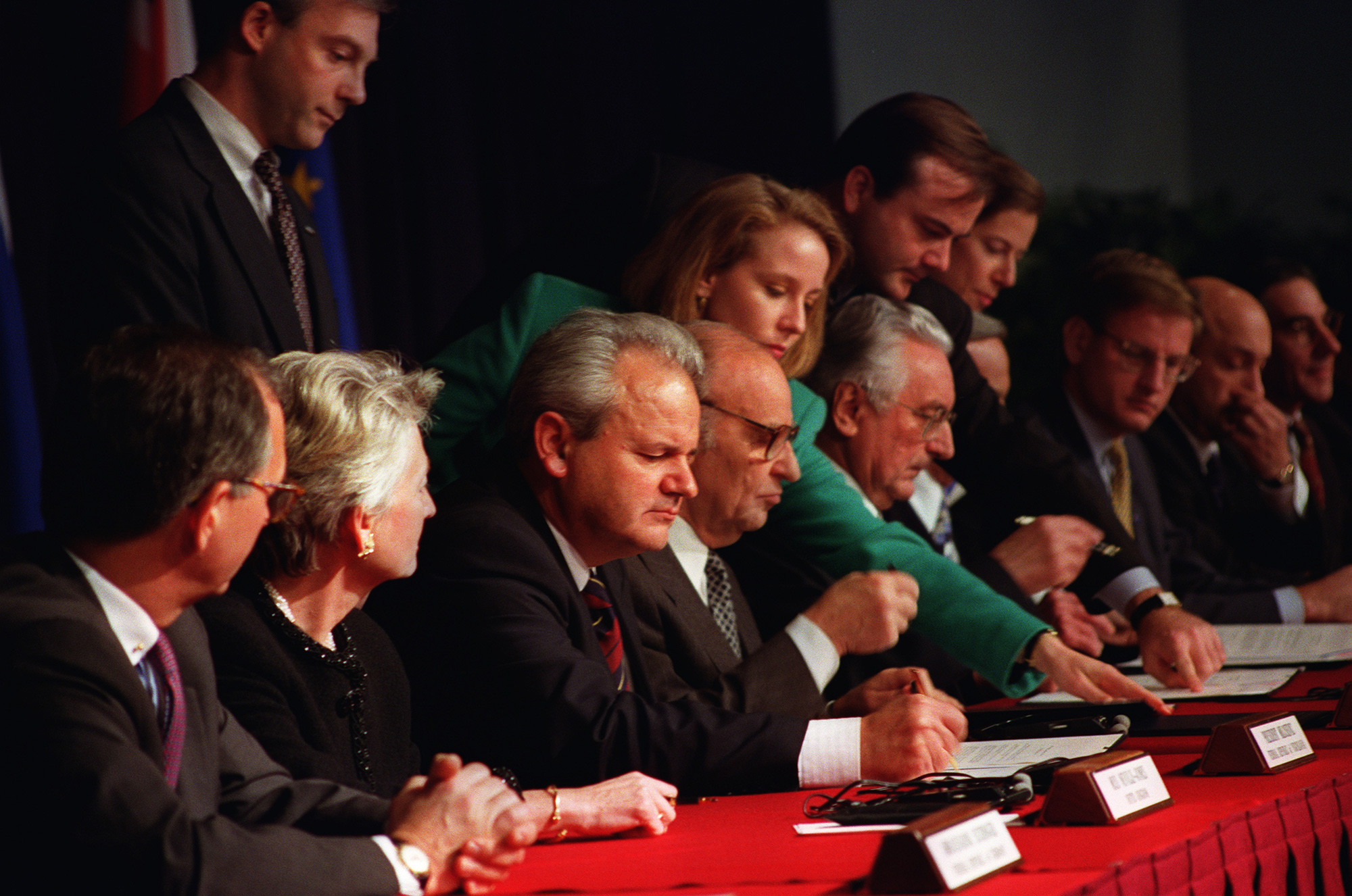
Slobodan Milošević, Alija Izetbegović and Franjo Tuđman signing the Dayton Peace Accords on 14 December 1995

At the beginning of the Bosnian War, Bosnian Croats were the first to organise themselves, especially Croats in western Herzegovina who were already armed. At the end of May 1992, Croats launched a counter-offensive, liberating Mostar after a month of fighting. Also, in central Bosnia and Posavina, Croatian forces stopped the Serbian advance, and in some places, they repelled the enemy. On 16 June 1992, the president of Croatia, Franjo Tuđman, and the president of the Presidency of Bosnia and Herzegovina, Alija Izetbegović, signed an alliance according to which, Bosnia and Herzegovina legalised the activity of the Croatian Army and the Croatian Defence Council on its territory. The Bosnian Croat political leadership and the Croatian leadership urged Izetbegović to form a confederation between Bosnia and Herzegovina and Croatia. However, Izetbegović denied this, as he sought to represent the interests of Muslims and Croats, as well as those of Serbs. The Bosnian Croat leadership was irritated by Izetbegović's neutrality, so Mate Boban threatened to withdraw the HVO from operations in Bosnia and Herzegovina. Since the UN implemented an embargo on Bosnia and Herzegovina on the import of arms, Muslim and Croat forces had difficulties fighting Serbian units, which were supplied with arms from the Middle East, just before the outbreak of war. However, after Croat and Muslim forces reorganised in late May 1992, the Serbian advance was halted, and their forces mostly remained in their positions during the war. The tensions between Croats and Muslims started on 19 June 1992, but the real war began in October.

The Croat-Muslim War was at its peak in 1993. In March 1994, the Muslim and Croat leadership signed the Washington Agreement, according to which the areas controlled by the Army of the Republic of Bosnia and Herzegovina (ARBiH) and the HVO were united into the Federation of Bosnia and Herzegovina. After the Washington Agreement was signed, the Croatian Army, HVO, and ARBiH liberated southwestern Bosnia and Herzegovina through seven military operations. In December 1995, the Bosnian War came to an end with the signing of the Dayton Agreement. However, the same agreement caused problems in Bosnia and Herzegovina and was largely ineffective. According to the information published by the Research and Documentation Centre in Sarajevo, 7,762 Croats were killed or missing. From the territory of the Federation of Bosnia and Herzegovina, 230,000 Croats were expelled, while from the territory of Republika Srpska, 152,856 Croats were expelled.

== Demographics ==
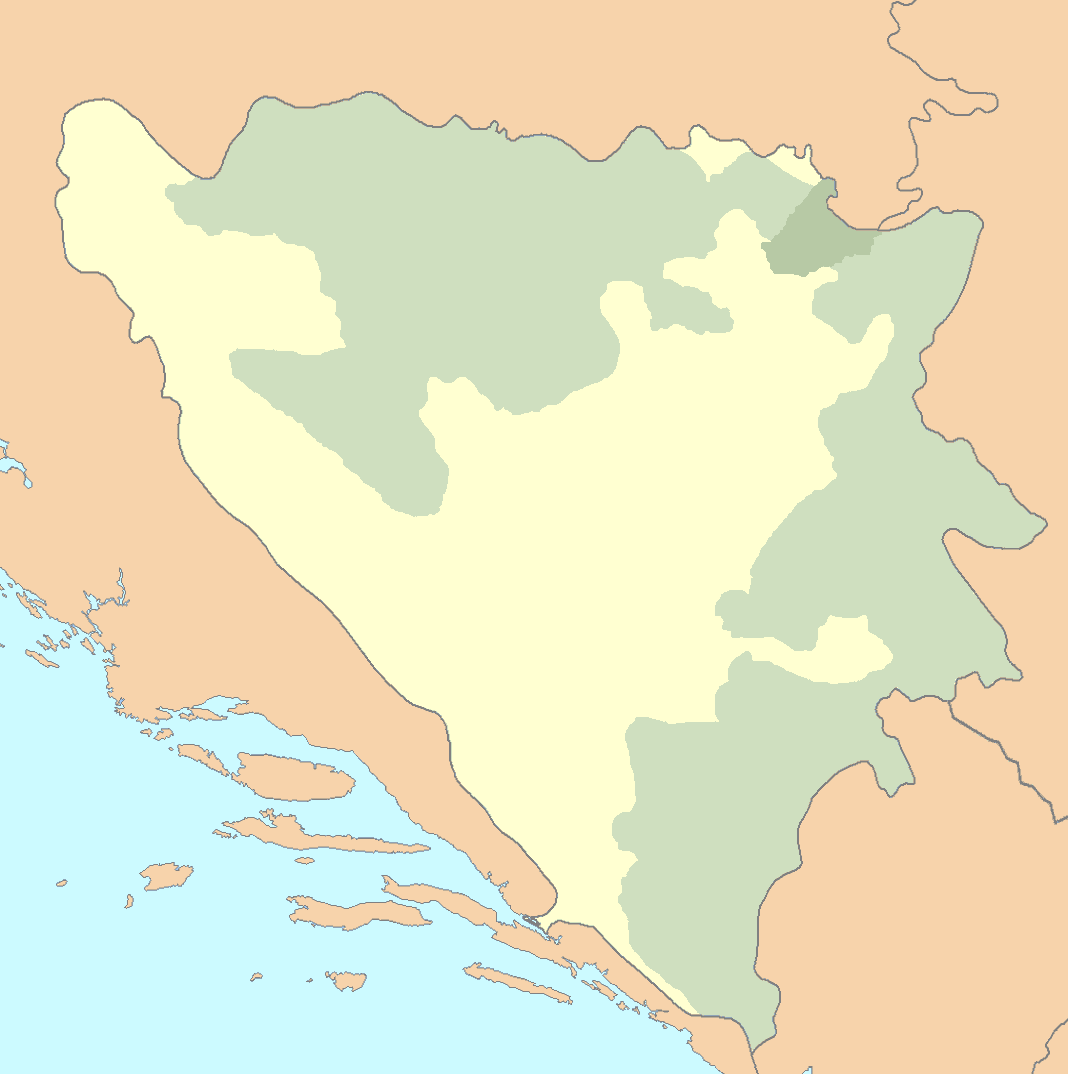
Demographic distribution of Croats of BiH. 91% of country's Croats live in the Federation

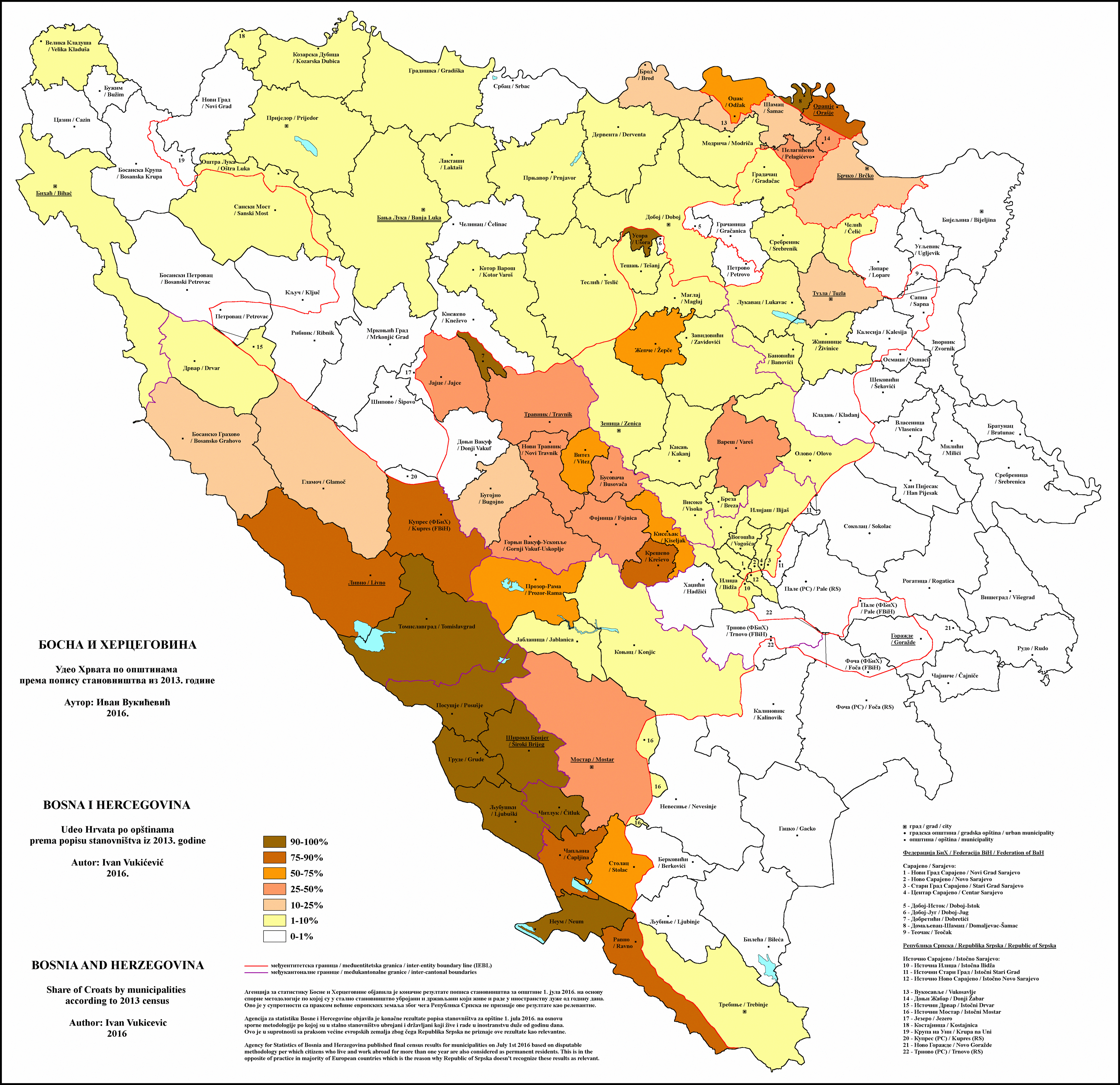
2013 census

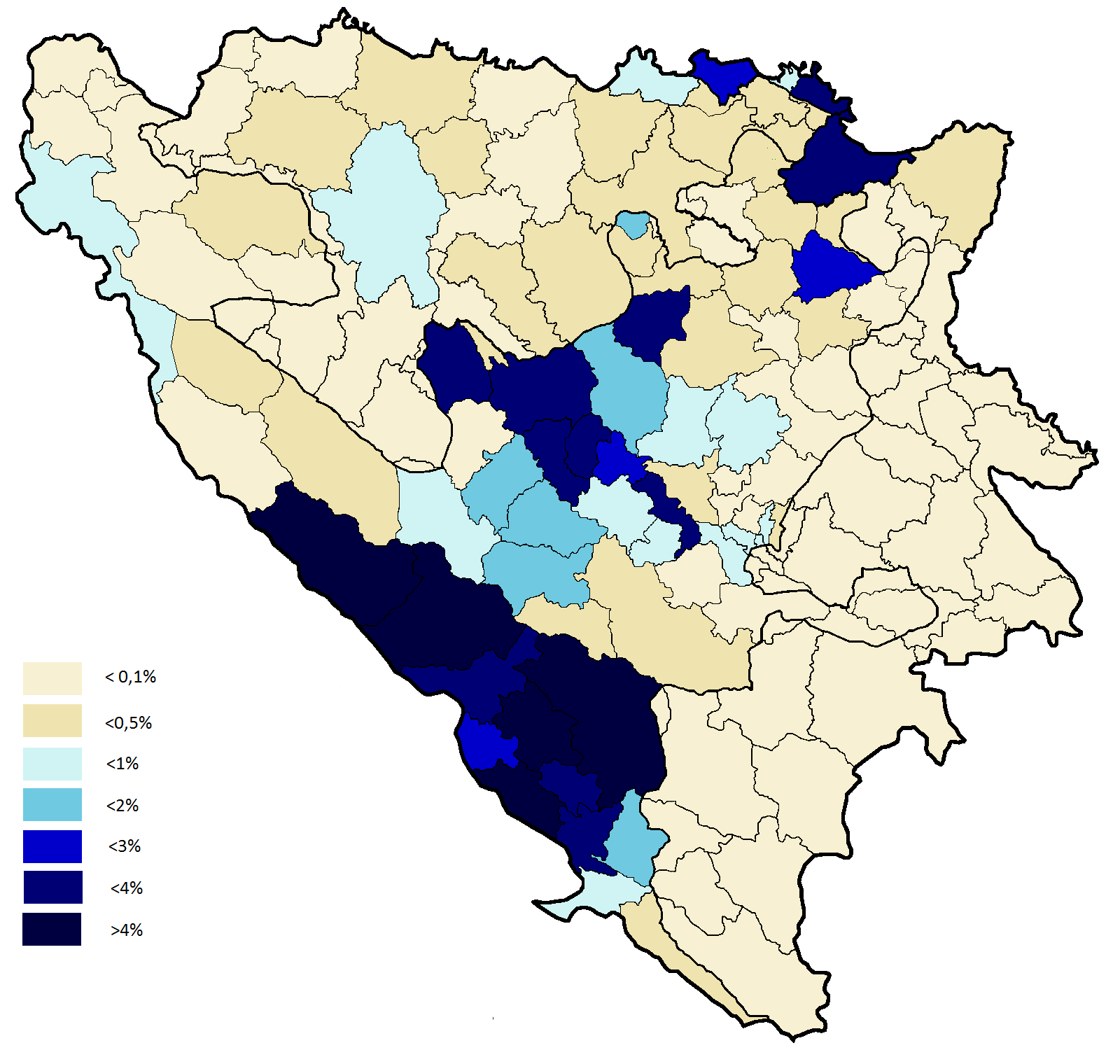
Geographical distribution of Croats (2013): share of Croats living in a municipality in the total number of Croats

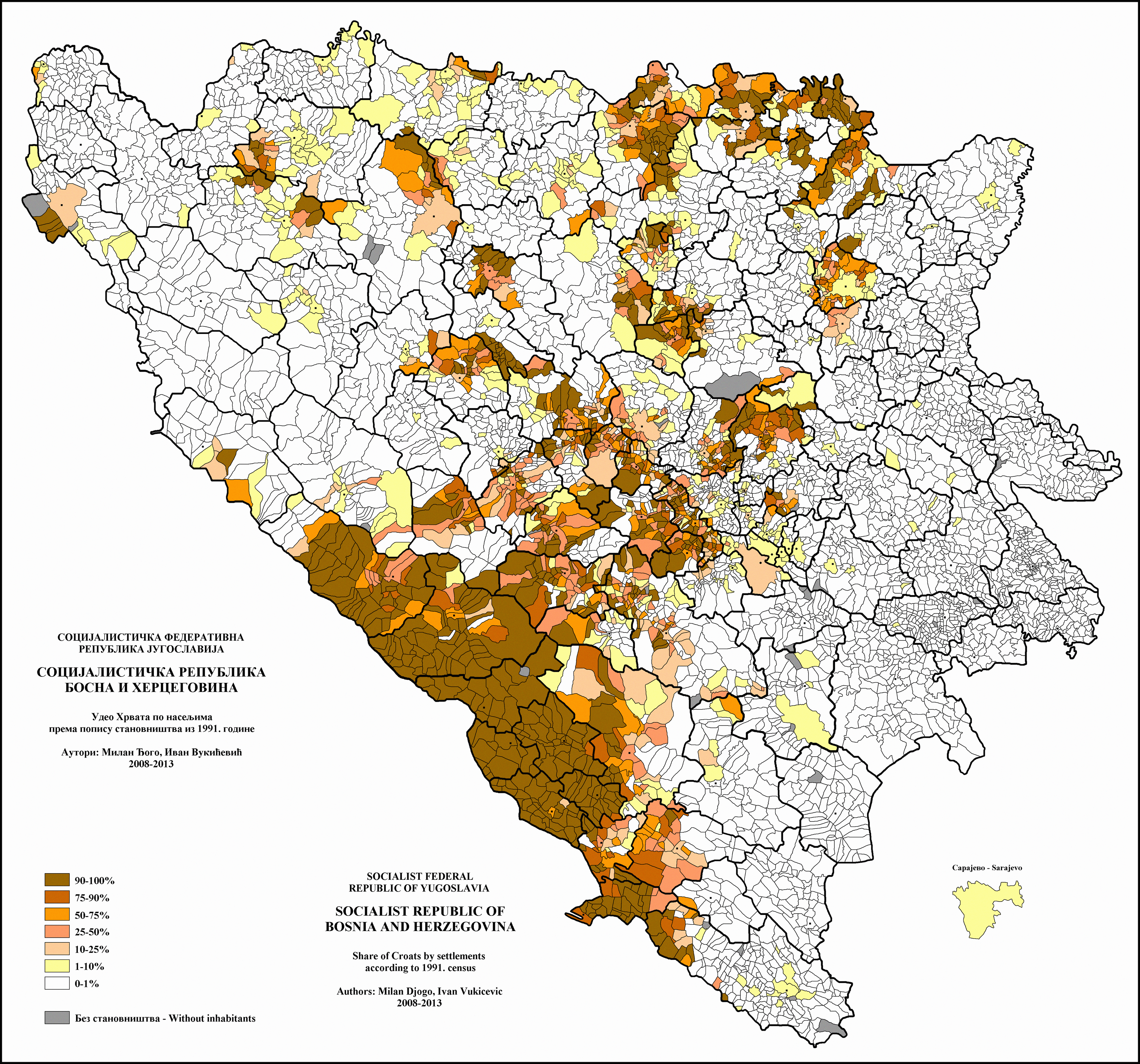
Share of Croats in settlements of Bosnia and Herzegovina, 1991 census

Bosnian Croats make up 15.43% of the country's population. Currently, according to the 2013 census, 91% of them live in the Federation of Bosnia and Herzegovina, while just 5.4% and 3.2% live in Republika Srpska and Brčko District, respectively. In Republika Srpska, the Croats make up just 2% (29,645) of the entity's population, while in Brčko, their share stands at 20.7% (17,252). On the other hand, in the Federation of Bosnia and Herzegovina, Croats form 22.4% of the entity's population. Four out of ten Federal cantons have a Croat majority. All Croat-majority municipalities are also located within this entity.

According to the Croatian Ministry of Interior, 384,631 Croatian citizens had registered residence in Bosnia and Herzegovina in July 2019.

=== Municipalities ===
Most of the municipalities with a clear Croat majority form two compact regions. One is in the southwest of the country, along the border with Croatia, from Kupres and Livno in the northwest along West Herzegovina to Ravno in the southeast (Široki Brijeg, Ljubuški, Livno, Čitluk, Tomislavgrad, Čapljina, Posušje, Grude, Prozor-Rama, Stolac, Neum, Kupres, Ravno). Around 40% of the country's and 45% of the Federation's Croats live here. The second is Posavina Canton in the north (Orašje, Odžak, Domaljevac-Šamac). This canton's share of the Croat population is 6%. Other Croat-majority or -plurality municipalities are enclaves in Central Bosnia and around Zenica (Dobretići, Vitez, Busovača, Kiseljak, Usora, Kreševo, Žepče). In ethnically mixed Jajce and Novi Travnik in Central Bosnia, Croats comprise 46% of the population.

In Mostar area, Croats comprise the plurality of the population both in the municipality (48.4%) and the city itself (49%). Mostar is the largest city in Herzegovina and the city with the largest Croat population in the country (51,216 in the area and 29,475 in the urban district). Croats comprise an overwhelming majority in the western part of both the city and the entire municipality.

Croats comprise 41% of the population in Gornji Vakuf-Uskoplje, a third in Vareš and Pelagićevo, and a quarter in Glamoč and Donji Žabar. In Bosansko Grahovo, Croats make up approximately 15% of the population.

Additionally, 762 Croats form the plurality (40.4%) in the ethnically diverse small town of Glamoč.

=== Cantons ===
There are four Croat-majority cantons and, in total, six cantons in which Croats form more than 10% of the population.

Canton	Croats	%	Share in total Croat population
West Herzegovina	93,783	96.82%	17.21%
Canton 10	64,604	76.79%	11.86%
Posavina Canton	33,600	77.32%	6.17%
Central Bosnia Canton	97,629	38.33%	17.92%
Herzegovina-Neretva Canton	118,297	53.29%	21.71%
Zenica-Doboj Canton	43,819	12.02%	8.04%

=== Demographic history ===
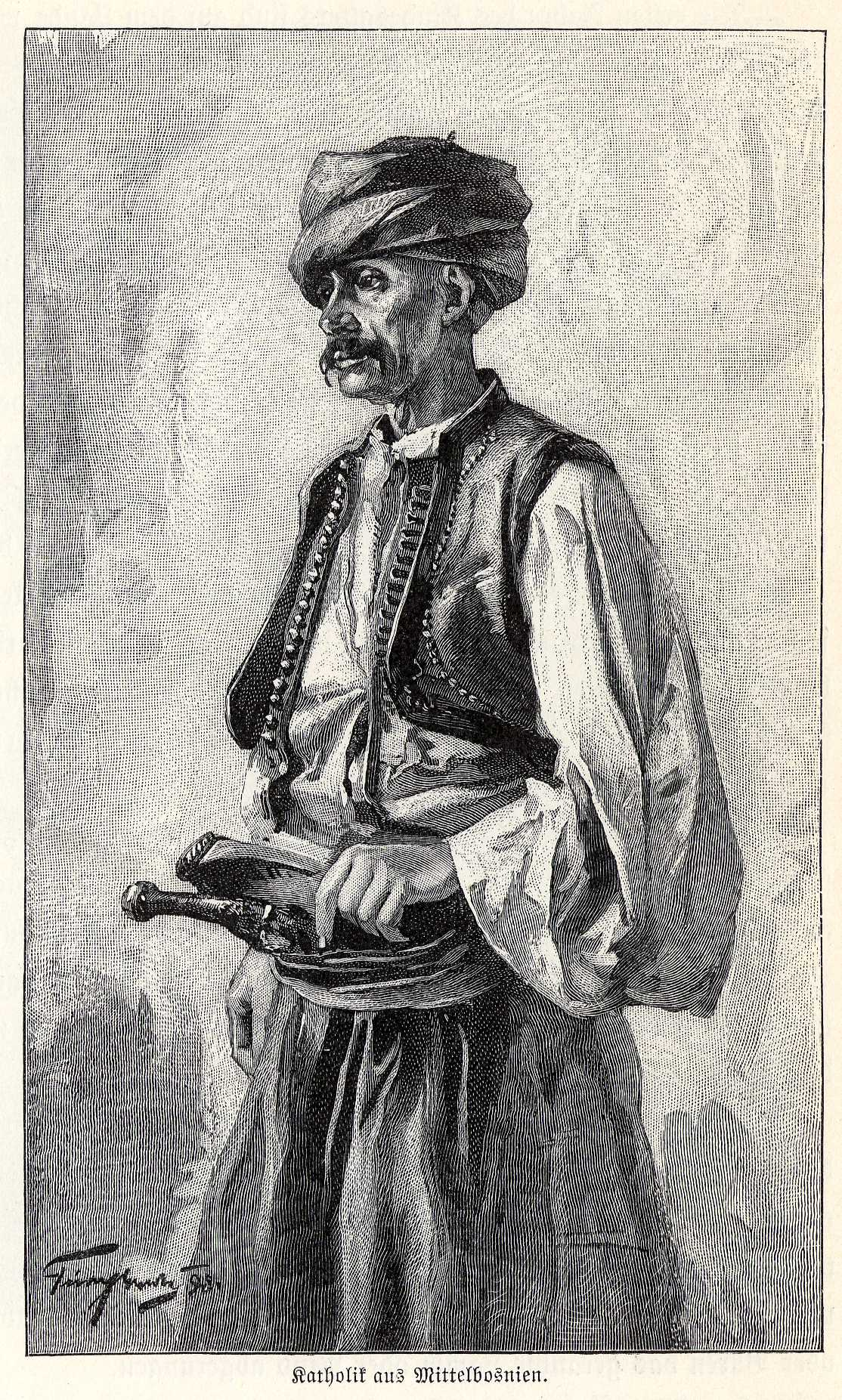
A Croat from Central Bosnia (1901)

Ethnic totals and percentages
Year	Catholics (Note: Refers to the Latin Catholics, not Eastern Catholics who were also present during the Austrian-Hungarian rule, and includes different ethnicities that migrated to Bosnia and Herzegovina, mainly after 1885, not just Croats.)	%	Total population
1851	173,200	16.07%	1,077,956
1870	220,353	14.59%	1,510,307
1879	209,391	18.08%	1,158,440
1885	265,788	19.89%	1,336,091
1895	334,142 (Note: Larger immigrations of Catholics of different ethnic backgrounds after 1885 contributed to the increase.)	21.31%	1,568,092
1910	434,061 (Note: Of those, 390,009 were native speakers of Serbo-Croatian, i.e., ethnic Croats.)	22.87%	1,898,044
1921	444,309	23.50%	1,890,440
1931	547,949	23.58%	2,323,555
Year	Croats	%	Total population
1948	614,123	23.93%	2,565,277
1953	654,229	22.97%	2,847,790
1961	711,666	21.71%	3,277,948
1971	772,491	20.62%	3,746,111
1981	758,140	18.39%	4,124.008
1991	760,852	17.38%	4,377,053
2013	544,780	15.43%	3,531,159
Official Population Census Results

==== Yugoslavia ====
Several thousand of these settlers and their descendants returned to their respective countries, either voluntarily or due to persecution which occurred between 1918 and 1921 after the Kingdom of Yugoslavia was created. Those most impacted by expulsion were Germans, Hungarians and Italians. After World War II, almost all Germans and Italians were expelled from the country, while Poles were the subject of organised emigration in 1946.

According to the 1931 census, Bosnia and Herzegovina had 2,323,787 inhabitants, of whom the Eastern Orthodox made 44.25%, Muslims 30.90%, Catholcs 23.58%, and others made 1.02% of the total population.

The first Yugoslav census recorded a decreasing number of Croats; from the first census in 1948 to the last one in 1991, the percentage of Croats decreased from 23% to 17.3%, despite an increase in the total number. According to the 1953 census, Croats were in the majority in territories which became part of the Banovina of Croatia in 1939. Their total number was 654,229, which is 23,00% of the total population of Bosnia and Herzegovina. According to the 1961 census, Croats comprised 21.7% of the total population, with a population of 711,660. After that, districts were divided into smaller municipalities.

According to the 1971 census, Croats comprised 20.6% of the total population, with a population of 772,491. According to the 1981 census, Croats comprised 18.60% of the total population, with a population of 767,247. In comparison to the 1971 census, for the first time, the percentage of Croats was below 20%, and after 1981, their percentage continued to fall. Between 1971 and 1991, the population of Croats declined due to emigration to Croatia and Western Europe. Nevertheless, the fall in population percentage is only absent in western Herzegovina municipalities where Croats account for more than 98% of the population. According to the 1991 census, Croats comprised 17.3% of the total population, with a population of 755,895.

==== Bosnian War ====
The total number of Croats in Bosnia and Herzegovina continued to fall, especially after the Bosnian War broke out in 1992. Soon, an exodus of Bosnian Croats occurred when a large number of Croats were expelled from central Bosnia and Posavina. According to the 1996 census, made by UNHCR and officially unrecognized, there were 571,317 Croats in the country (14.57%).

== Education ==
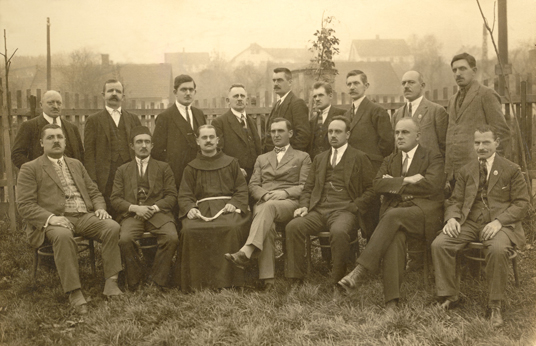
The Napredak Palace Board members in 1911

The first educational institutions of Bosnian Croats were monasteries, of which the most significant were those in Kreševo, Fojnica, Kraljeva Sutjeska and Tolisa, and later monasteries in Herzegovina, of which the most significant are those in Humac and Široki Brijeg. The most substantial individuals working for the elementary education of Bosnian Croats in the 19th century were Ivan Franjo Jukić and Grgo Martić, who founded and organised elementary schools throughout Bosnia and Herzegovina. In 1887, many elementary schools were founded in Bosnia and Herzegovina along with the Order of Sisters of St. Francis, whose classes were led methodologically and professionally, so Bosnian Croat schools were, at the end of the Ottoman era and beginning of Austrian-Hungarian occupation, the same as elementary schools in rest of Europe. The educational system of Bosnia and Herzegovina during communism was based on a mixture of nationalities and the suppression of Croat identity. With the establishment of the Croatian Community of Herzeg-Bosnia, Bosnian Croat schools adopted the Croatian educational system.

At the same time, University Džemal Bijedić of Mostar was renamed the University of Mostar, with Croatian as the official language. This university is the only one in Bosnia and Herzegovina that uses Croatian as its official language. After signing the Dayton Accords, jurisdiction over education in Republika Srpska was given to the RS Government, while in the Federation, jurisdiction over education was given to the cantons. In municipalities with a Croat majority or significant minority, schools with Croatian as an official language also exist. In territories where there is only a small number of Croats, Catholic centres perform educational functions. Other educational institutions include HKD Napredak, the Scientific Research Institute of the University of Mostar, the Croatian Lexicographic Institute of Bosnia and Herzegovina, and the Institute for Education in Mostar.

== Language ==
Croats of Bosnia and Herzegovina speak mostly the Younger Ikavian dialect, but widely use the standardised Croatian language for official purposes.

== Politics ==
=== State level ===
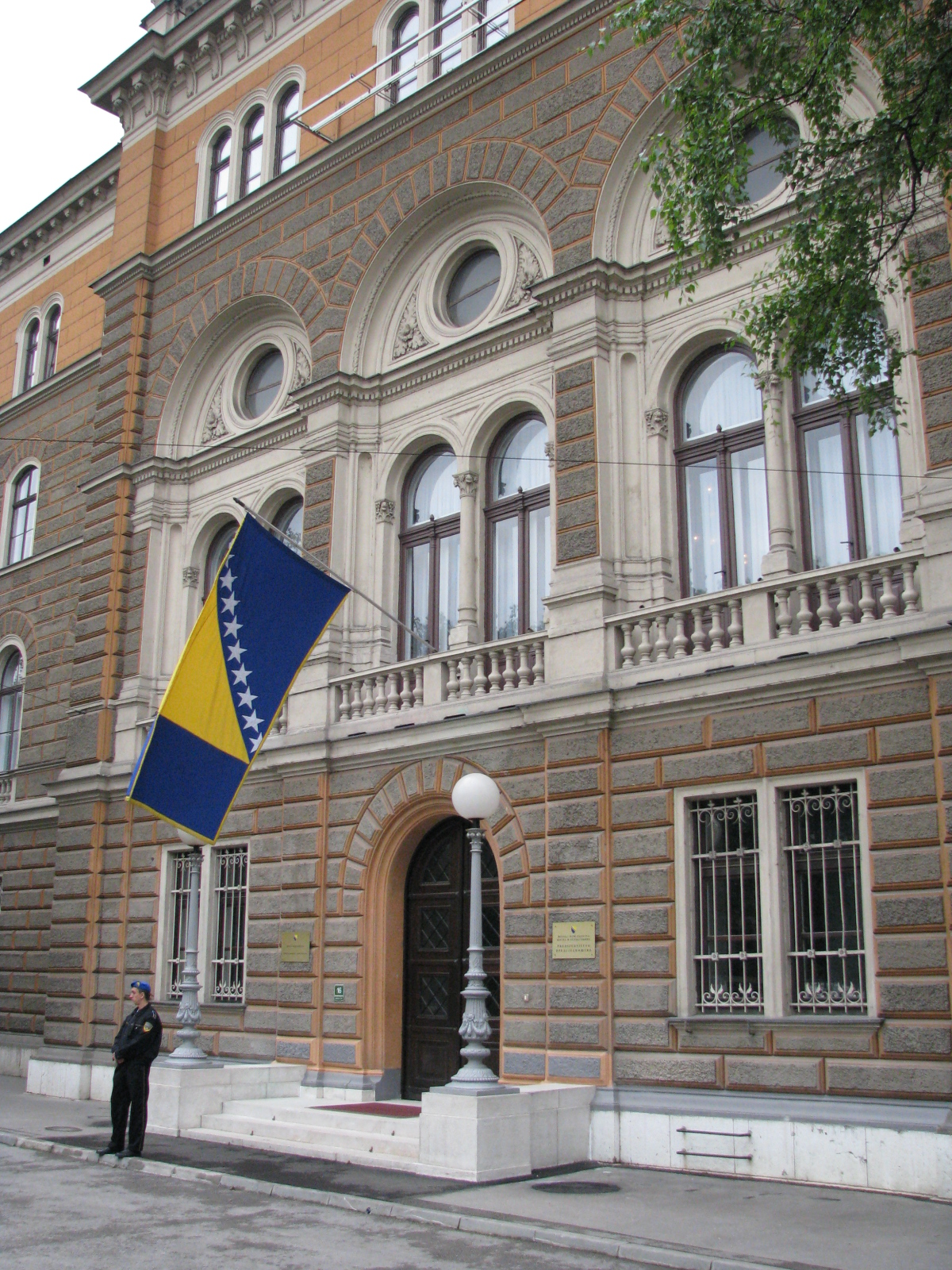
Building of the Presidency of Bosnia and Herzegovina in 2004

Croats of Bosnia and Herzegovina, as well as the other two constitutive nations, have their representative in the Presidency of Bosnia and Herzegovina. The Presidency has three members, one Bosniak, one Croat, and one Serb. Bosniak and Croat are elected in the Federation of Bosnia and Herzegovina, while Serb is elected in the Republika Srpska.

The current Croat member of the Presidency is Željko Komšić of the Democratic Front.

The Parliamentary Assembly of Bosnia and Herzegovina has two chambers: the House of Representatives and the House of Peoples. The House of Peoples has 15 members: five Bosniaks, five Croats, and five Serbs. Bosniak and Croat members of the House of Peoples are elected in the Parliament of the Federation of Bosnia and Herzegovina. In contrast, five Serb members are elected in the National Assembly of Republika Srpska. The 42 members of the House of Representatives are elected directly by voters, two-thirds are from the Federation, while one-third is from the Republika Srpska.

=== Federal level ===
Flag of the Federation of Bosnia and Herzegovina between 1996 and 2007 showing a controversial Bosniak and a Croatian symbol

The Parliament of the Federation of Bosnia and Herzegovina consists also of two chambers, House of Representatives, which consists of 98 members, and House of Peoples that consists of 58 members.

Members of the House of Representatives are elected directly by the citizens of Bosnia and Herzegovina. In contrast, members of the House of Peoples are selected by the cantonal assemblies. There are 17 representatives in the House of Peoples of each constitutive nation, Bosniaks, Croats, and Serbs. The Other seven representatives are those of national minorities.

In electing the president and two vice-presidents of the Federation, at least one-third of the delegates of the respective Bosniak, Croat or Serb caucuses in the House of Peoples may nominate the president and two vice presidents of the Federation. The election for the president and two vice presidents of the Federation shall require the joint approval of the list of three nominees by a majority vote in the House of Representatives, and then by a majority vote in the House of Peoples, including the majority of each constituent people's caucus. The current president of the Federation of Bosnia and Herzegovina is Marinko Čavara of the Croatian Democratic Union.

The Government of the Federation of Bosnia and Herzegovina should be composed of 16 ministers, with 8 Bosniaks, 5 Croats, and 3 Serbs.

In January 2017, Croatian National Assembly stated that "if Bosnia and Herzegovina wants to become self-sustainable, then it is necessary to have an administrative-territorial reorganization, which would include a federal unit with a Croatian majority. It remains the permanent aspiration of the Croatian people of Bosnia and Herzegovina."

=== Political parties ===
Currently, several Croatian political parties are active in Bosnia and Herzegovina, many of which correspond to parties within Croatia itself. The Croatian Democratic Union of Bosnia and Herzegovina (HDZ BiH), Croatian Democratic Union 1990 (HDZ 1990) are the most popular parties.

HDZ was founded in 1990 and is a major political party among the Croats of Bosnia and Herzegovina, being the most powerful during the Bosnian War (1992–1995) and the existence of the Croatian Republic of Herzeg-Bosnia (1991–1994). HDZ is Christian democratic, conservative and pro-Europeanist political party.

HDZ 1990 is a split party of the Croatian Democratic Union, founded in 2006, however, their ideology is very similar to one of the HDZ. HDZ 1990 is also Christian democratic and pro-Europeanist.

=== Open issues ===
A conference was held in Neum, Bosnia and Herzegovina on October 27 and 28, 2005, under the title "Constitutional position of Croats in Bosnia and Herzegovina - language, education, culture, and media" (Croatian: Ustavno-pravni položaj Hrvata u BiH - jezik, obrazovanje, kultura i mediji).

It was organised by the University of Mostar and the Croatian Society of Arts and Science. It produced the Declaration of the constitutional-law position of Croats in Bosnia and Herzegovina. (The words "constitutional-law position" refer to the position of Croats as one of the constitutive nations of Bosnia and Herzegovina). Croat member of the Presidency Ivo Miro Jović sponsored the conference, and it also received support from numerous other organisations.

The Declaration produced several demands about the equal treatment of the Croatian population in Bosnia and Herzegovina. Most significant of these was the creation of three republics within the nation:

- "Starting from the scientific cognition and practical experiences, we think that in consultation with the representatives of Serbian and Bosniak people and the International Community, we should organise Bosnia and Herzegovina as a compound federal state, composed of three federal units and three levels of government. Since only the republic, as a democratic form of the rule of nations, includes and guarantees the highest level of democracy, political, cultural, and every other autonomy, we pledge for the establishment of three republics for three sovereign nations, which is in full accordance with the provisions of the United Nations Pact on the civil, social and cultural rights to the equality of all nations regardless of their numerousness."

The Declaration upheld the right to learn Croatian in school as well as the need for the preservation of their people's culture. Another critical issue was the need for a Croat television station within the country.

== Culture ==
=== Art ===
In the area near the Neretva River, a Hellenized Illyrian tribe, the Daorsi, spread cultural influences from Greece. Their capital Daorson on Oršćani near Stolac is today the most significant centre of ancient culture in Bosnia and Herzegovina. The complex of the terraced shrine near Gradac near Posušje, built in 183, was dedicated to a dead Roman Emperor, Marcus Aurelius. Late Roman art in Bosnia and Herzegovina was characterised by the building of villas, Christian mausoleums, basilicas, and oratories like Vila "Mogorjelo" near Čapljina (early 4th century). The influence of Romanesque architecture arrived in Bosnia and Herzegovina through Croatia, but it was never entirely accepted; only its elements were incorporated. Such buildings include St. Luke's Tower in Jajce (15th century) or motifs of stećak tombstones. Valuable manuscripts of Bosnian origin occur at this time.

Hrvoje's Missal is the most significant medieval Bosnian Croatian artwork, written in the 15th century. During the 15th and 16th centuries, Bosnia and Herzegovina was under Ottoman rule, which destroyed the influence of the Renaissance and Baroque, the impact of which was only present in Franciscan monasteries in Visoko, Kreševo, Fojnica, and Kraljeva Sutjeska. The first Bosnian Croat painters were educated in European academies in Vienna, Munich, Prague, Kraków, Budapest and Paris. Their education was funded by HKD Napredak. The most famous Bosnian Croat painters are Gabrijel Jurkić, Karlo Mijić, Branko Radulović, and Petar Šain. Statuary was reduced to the memorial portraits, of which the most famous is that of Robert Frangeš-Mihanović and Sputani genije, a statue on the grave of Silvije Strahimir Kranjčević built by Rudolf Valdec. After World War II, the Association of Artists of Bosnia and Herzegovina was founded along with the Painting State School and the Sarajevo Art Gallery. Architectural Regionalism is evident in buildings such as the department stores "Razvitak" in Mostar (1970) and Jajce (1976). The best example of Functionalism is the multiple award-winning hotel Ruža in Mostar (1979).

=== Literature ===
Bosnian Croat literature comprises works written in Croatian by authors originating from Bosnia and Herzegovina and considered part of Croatian literature. It consists of pre-Ottoman literature (first written monuments, texts of the Bosnian Church, diplomatic and law documents, manuscripts on tombstones), Bosna Srebrena literature (prayer books, catechisms, collections of sermons, biographies of saints, monastery yearbooks, first historical works, poems and memoirs, travel books, grammars of Latin and Croatian, and lexicographic works), national awakening literature (the foundation of various associations, reading rooms, libraries in which writing courses were held), the literature of Bosnian Muslims (various Bosniak writers made a significant impact on Croatian literature and were influenced by other Croat authors) and modern Bosnian Croat literature.

The best known contributors to the Bosnian Croat literature are Ivan Aralica, Matija Divković, Mirko Kovač, Ivo Kozarčanin, Silvije Strahimir Kranjčević, Tomislav Ladan, Vitomir Lukić, Grgo Martić, Matija Mažuranić, and Antun Branko Šimić.

=== Music ===
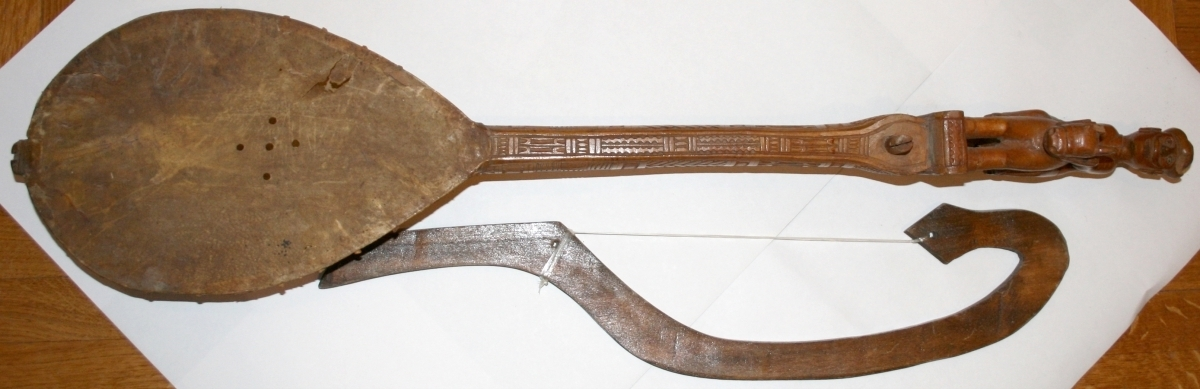
Gusle

The traditional music of Croats of Bosnia and Herzegovina is related to ganga, klapa, gusle, tamburica and šargija. Those ways of singing and the use of musical instruments are part of the Bosnian Croat national identity. Ganga, klapa, and gusle are most widespread in the territory of western Herzegovina, although they can also be found in eastern Herzegovina and Bosnia. Tamburica is popular in Posavina and central Bosnia. Šargija is widespread in northern Bosnia, from Posavina to Olovo and Vareš.

The most well-known singers of modern Bosnian Croat music are Željko Bebek and Jura Stublić. Some new known singers include Mate Bulić, Ivan Mikulić, Nikša Bratoš, Ivana Marić, the Feminnem girl band, and others. Some other well-known Croatian singers originate from Bosnia and Herzegovina, including Ivo Fabijan, Boris Novković, Vesna Pisarović, and others. There are two significant music festivals, Melodije Mostara (Melodies of Mostar) and Etnofest Neum on which musicians from Croatia also participate. Alongside traditional music, some other musical genres also developed, like heavy metal, hip hop, house and techno.

=== Religion ===
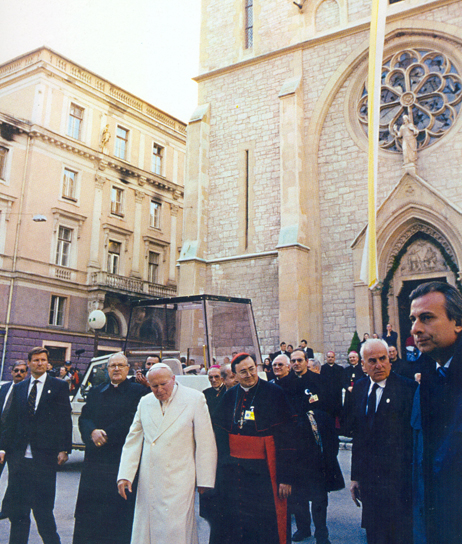
Pope John Paul II and Cardinal Vinko Puljić in front of the Sarajevo cathedral

Croats are the core of the Catholic Church in Bosnia and Herzegovina. The metropolitan diocese is the Archdiocese of Vrhbosna. There are also dioceses centred in Banja Luka and Mostar, of which Mostar is the largest. Vinko Puljić is the current Cardinal and Archbishop of Vrhbosna. The Sacred Heart Cathedral in Sarajevo is the largest cathedral in Bosnia and Herzegovina, and is the seat of the Roman Catholic Archdiocese of Vrhbosna. The other three Roman Catholic cathedrals in Bosnia and Herzegovina are the Cathedral of Saint Bonaventure in Banja Luka, the Cathedral of Mary, Mother of the Church in Mostar, and the Cathedral of the Birth of Mary in Trebinje.

There are numerous monasteries throughout the region. The oldest is the 14th-century Friary of the Holy Spirit, located in Fojnica, central Bosnia, which houses an extensive library filled with numerous historical documents dating back to medieval Bosnia. Two other well-known monasteries are the Guča Gora Monastery near Travnik and Kraljeva Sutjeska Monastery near Kakanj, both located in central Bosnia. The rest of the monasteries in the region are the Monastery of St. Anthony in Sarajevo, the Monastery of St. Mark in Derventa, Gorica Monastery in Livno, and the Čajniče Monastery in Prozor-Rama. The oldest preserved church in Bosnia is the Old Church of St. Michael in Vareš. It was built before the 16th century.

The parish of Međugorje is a significant Marian shrine that attracts approximately one million visitors each year. It became a popular site of religious pilgrimage due to reports of apparitions of the Virgin Mary to six local Catholics in 1981. Over a thousand hotel and hostel beds are available for religious tourism.

=== Sports ===
Croatian-run clubs are well represented in terms of national championships, considering the percentage of Croats in the population. In football, HŠK Zrinjski Mostar, NK Široki Brijeg, NK Žepče, HŠK Posušje, and HNK Orašje are some of the most successful. Collectively, they have won three national Cups and five national Championships since the national competition began in 2000. Other Croatian-run clubs are NK Brotnjo, NK SAŠK Napredak, NK Ljubuški, HNK Sloga Uskoplje. The clubs are often among the nation's most multi-ethnic.

Before 2000, the Croats ran their own unapproved football league. However, they have joined the UEFA-approved Football Association of Bosnia and Herzegovina's league system. Bosnia and Herzegovina has produced many successful internationals, both for the Croatia national team and the national team of Bosnia and Herzegovina.

== See also ==
- Bosnia and Herzegovina–Croatia relations
- List of Croats
- Turkish Croatia
- Sicanje

== Sources ==
- Bideleux, Robert; Jeffries, Ian (2007). The Balkans: A Post-Communist History. Taylor & Francis. ISBN 978-0-415-22962-3.
- Bilandžić, Dušan (1999). Hrvatska moderna povijest (in Croatian). Golden marketing. ISBN 953-6168-50-2.
- Bove, Laurence F.; Duhan-Kaplan, Laura (1995). From the Eye of the Storm: Regional Conflicts and the Philosophy of Peace. Atlanta. ISBN 90-5183-870-0.
- Čović, Dragan (2011). Statut, program, programska deklaracija (in Croatian). Croatian Democratic Union of Bosnia and Herzegovina.
- Čuvalo, Ante (2010). The A to Z of Bosnia and Herzegovina. Rowman & Littlefield. ISBN 9780810876477.
- Dizdar, Zdravko (2004). "Djelovanje HKD "Napredak" u Hrvatskoj (1902. - 1941.)". Časopis za suvremenu povijest (in Croatian). Vol. 36. Hrvatski institut za povijest.
- Donia, Robert J.; Van Antwerp Fine, John (1994). Bosnia and Hercegovina: A Tradition Betrayed. C. Hurst & Co. Publishers. ISBN 978-1-85065-211-3.
- Donia, Robert J. (2006). Sarajevo: A Biography. University of Michigan Press. ISBN 0-472-11557-X.
- Džaja, Srećko Marko (1992). "Katoličanstvo u Bosni i Hercegovini od Kulina bana do austro-ugarske okupacije". Croatica Christiana periodica (in Croatian). Catholicism in Bosnia and Herzegovina from Ban Kulin to Austrian-Hungairan occupation: Catholic Faculty of Theology, University of Zagreb.
- Džaja, Srećko Matko (1999). Konfesionalnost i nacionalnost Bosne i Hercegovine [Religion and Ethnicity of Bosnia and Herzegovina] (in Croatian). Mostar: ZIRAL. ISBN 9536364212.
- Džaja, Srećko Marko (2012). "The Bosnian-Herzegovinian Croats: A Historical-Cultural Profile". Croatian Studies Review. 8.
- Džino, Danijel (2010). Becoming Slav, Becoming Croat: Identity Transformations in Post-Roman and Early Medieval Dalmatia. Koninklijke Brill. ISBN 978-90-04-18646-0.
- Englar, Mary (2007). Bosnia-Herzegovina in Pictures. Twenty-First Century Books. ISBN 9780822523932.
- Ethnicity/National Affiliation, Religion and Mother Tongue (PDF). Sarajevo: Agency for Statistics of Bosnia and Herzegovina. 2019.
- Fine, John Van Antwerp Jr. (1991) [1983]. The Early Medieval Balkans: A Critical Survey from the Sixth to the Late Twelfth Century. University of Michigan Press. ISBN 978-0-472-08149-3.
- Franolić, Branko (1984). A Short History of Literary Croatian. Nouvelles éditions latines.
- Frucht, Richard C. (2005). Eastern Europe: An Introduction to the People, Lands, and Culture. Vol. 1. ABC-CLIO. ISBN 1-57607-800-0.
- Grandits, Hannes; Clayer, Nathalie; Pichler, Robert (2011). Conflicting Loyalties in the Balkans: The Great Powers, the Ottoman Empire and Nation Building. I. B. Tauris. ISBN 978-1-84885-477-2.
- Hadžijahić, Muhamed (1990). Porijeklo bosanskih Muslimana [The origin of the Bosnian Muslims] (in Serbo-Croatian). Sarajevo: Bosna.
- Herb, Guntram H.; Kaplan, David H. (2008). Nations and Nationalism: A Global Historical Overview. ABC-CLIO. ISBN 978-1-85109-907-8.
- Heršak, Emil (1993). "Panoptikum migracija − Hrvati, hrvatski prostor i Evropa" [Panopticon of Migrations − Croats, Croatian Space and Europe]. Migracijske i etničke teme (in Croatian). 9 (3–4). Zagreb: Institut za migracije i narodnosti.
- Ibrahimagić, Omer (1996). Bosanska srednjovjekovna država i suvremenost (in Bosnian). Faculty of Political Science of University of Sarajevo.
- Kacowicz, Arie M.; Lutomski, Pawel (2007). Population Resettlement in International Conflicts: A Comparative Study. Lexington Book. ISBN 978-0-7391-1607-4.
- Karamatić, Marko (1997). Katoličanstvo u Bosni i Hercegovini [Catholicism in Bosnia and Herzegovina]. Sarajevo: HKD Napredak.
- Klaić, Vjekoslav (1878). Bosna (Zemljopis) (in Croatian). Matica hrvatska.
- Klemenčić, Mladen; Pratt, Martin; Schofield, Clive H. (1994). Territorial Proposals for the Settlement of the War in Bosnia-Hercegovina. International Boundaries Research Unit. ISBN 978-1-897643-15-0.
- Klemenčić, Mladen; Schofield, Clive H. (2001). War and Peace on the Danube: The Evolution of the Croatia-Serbia Boundary. University of Durham, International Boundaries Research Unit. ISBN 978-1-897643-41-9.
- Lešić, Antun (2014). "Stanovništvo Slavonije krajem 17. i početkom 18. stoljeća" [The population of Slavonia at the end of the 17th and at the beginning of the 18th century]. Essehist: časopis studenata povijesti i drugih društveno-humanističkih znanosti (in Croatian). Osijek: Faculty of Humanities, University of Osijek.
- Lukic, Rénéo; Lynch, Allen (1999). Europe from the Balkans to the Urals: The Disintegration of Yugoslavia and the Soviet Union. Oxford University Press. ISBN 978-0-19-829200-5.
- Malcolm, Noel (1995). Povijest Bosne. Novi Liber. ISBN 953-6045-03-6.
- Maletić, Franjo (1993). Who is Who in Croatia. Golden marketing. ASIN B0000D6QL5.
- Mikaberidze, Alexander (2011). Conflict and Conquest in the Islamic World: A Historical Encyclopedia. ABC-CLIO. ISBN 978-1-59884-336-1.
- Moačanin, Nenad (2013). "Stanovništvo Bosanskog ejaleta u 18. stoljeću prema popisima glavarine" [The population of the Eyalet of Bosnia in the 18th century according to the head tax census]. Rad Hrvatske akademije znanosti i umjetnosti. Razred za društvene znanosti (in Croatian). Zagreb: Hrvatska akademija znanosti i umjetnosti.
- Mulaj, Klejda (2010). Politics of Ethnic Cleansing: Nation-State Building and Provision of In/Security in Twentieth-Century Balkans. Lexington Books. ISBN 978-0-7391-1783-5.
- Nohlen, Dieter; Stöver, Philip (2010). Elections in Europe: A Data Handbook. Nomos Verlagsgesellschaft Mbh & Co. ISBN 978-3-8329-5609-7.
- Omerović, Enes S. (2019). "'Odlazak kuferaša': Iseljavanje stranaca iz Bosne i Hercegovine neposrednk nakon Prvog svjetskog rata" ['Departure of the suitcase bearers': Emigration of foreigners from Bosnia and Herzegovina immediately after World War I]. Nacije i migracije: Studije iz bosanskohercegovačke historije (in Bosnian). Sarajevo: Udruženje za modernu historiju.
- Pinjuh, Dijana (2013). Vjerske prilike kod katolika u Hercegovini od turskog osvajanja do konca 17. stoljeća: disertacija [Religious circumstances among Catholics in Herzegovina from the Turkish conquest to the end of the 17th century: doctoral thesis] (in Croatian). Prague: University of Zagreb, Centre for Croatian Studies.
- Pinson, Mark (1996). The Muslims of Bosnia and Herzegovina: Their Historic Development from the Middle Ages to the Dissolution of Yugoslavia. Harvard CMES. ISBN 978-0-932885-12-8.
- Ramčilović, Zećir (2019). "Demografske promjene nakon Berlinskog kongresa (1878) u Bosni i Hercegovini" [Demographic changes in Bosnia and Herzegovina after the Congress of Berlin (1878)]. Historijski Pregledi (in Bosnian). Tuzla: Centar za istraživanje moderne i savremene historije Tuzla.
- Robbers, Gerhard (2006). Encyclopedia of World Constitutions. Infobase Publishing. ISBN 9780816060788.
- Smajić, Ramiza (2022). Migracije i Bosanski ejalet 1683-1718 [Migrations and the Eyalet of Bosnia 1683-1718] (in Bosnian). Sarajevo: Univerzitet u Sarajevu - Institut za historiju. ISBN 9789958649547.
- Velikonja, Mitja (2003). Religious Separation and Political Intolerance in Bosnia-Herzegovina. Texas A&M University Press. ISBN 978-1-58544-226-3.
- Vulliamy, Ed (1994). Seasons in Hell: Understanding Bosnia's War. Simon & Schuster. ISBN 0-671-71345-0.
- Zlopaša, Ivan (2005). Politička sudbina Hrvata u BiH (in Croatian). Hrvatski blok.
