= Cvitanović =

Cvitanović is a South Slavic patronymic surname meaning "son of Cvitan". Notable people with the surname include:

- Igor Cvitanović (born 1970), Croatian footballer
- Ilija Cvitanović (born 1976), Bosnian politician
- Mario Cvitanović (born 1975), Croatian football manager
- Predrag Cvitanović (born 1946), Croatian physicist

== See also ==
- Cvijanović
- Cvetanović
