= Cvetanović =

Cvetanović is a South Slavic patronymic surname meaning "son of Cvetan". Notable people with the surname include:

- Predrag Cvetanović, Serbian politician
- Zoran Cvetanović, Serbian footballer
- Zoran Cvetanović (basketball), Serbian basketball coach

== See also ==
- Cvitanović
