= Cvitan Spužević =

Yugoslav lawyer, politician and humanitarian

minister for construction of the People's Republic of Bosnia and Herzegovina
- In office April 27, 1945 – 1946
- Preceded by: Office established
- Succeeded by: Rado Jakšić

Personal details
- Born: ca. 1885 Mostar, Austria-Hungary
- Citizenship: Yugoslav
- Party: Croatian National Union (1927); Croatian Peasant Party
- Profession: lawyer, politician

Military service
- Allegiance: Yugoslavia
- Branch/service: Yugoslav Partisans
- Years of service: 1944–1945

Cvitan Spužević (c. 1885 – ?) was a Yugoslav lawyer, politician and humanitarian. As a Croat from Bosnia-Herzegovina, during World War II he was a member of the ZAVNOBiH and was later appointed as a minister in the first government of People's Republic of Bosnia and Herzegovina from 1945 to 1946.

== Biography ==
Spužević was born into a Bosnian Croat family which had been honored and celebrated with verses by the 19th century Croatian poet S.S. Kranjčević. Spužević graduated from Mostar Realgymnasium in 1901/2. After completing his law studies, he practiced law in Mostar. He was close to the Catholic Church and his practice was also employed as a legal representative for Herzegovina Franciscan friars’ in Kingdom of Yugoslavia. Spužević was active in politics and public life in general between the two world wars. Since 1910, he was a member of the Mostar branch of Croatian cultural society "Napredak", while in 1929 he was elected its vice president. In 1927 elections he opposed the policy of the Croatian Peasant Party (HSS) and founded Croatian National Union (HNZ) in opposition to it. In 1928 Spužević was also a founding member of the Fishermen society of Bosnia-Herzegovina branch in Mostar. In 1935 he was a board member of the Land bank of Bosnia-Herzegovina (Zemaljska banka za BiH).

=== Second World War ===
During the German and Italian invasion of Yugoslavia in April 1941, Spužević and his friend fra Leo Petrović organised negotiations between the surrendering Yugoslav army and invading Axis forces, still fighting in the Mostar area. After the breakup of Kingdom of Yugoslavia, Axis puppet state Independent State of Croatia under Ustaša regime was formed, encompassing Bosnia and Herzegovina. Soon, ustaša campaign of ethnic cleansing, directed against Serb, Jewish and Roma population (as well as all Croat opponents and dissidents) reached Mostar. In July 1942, according to his diary, Spužević tried to intervene with the ustaša minister of the interior Artuković to save some Mostar families, including Serbs, from the internment or execution. He also asked for an immediate release of the Serbs from ustaša prisons and for a stop and reversal of racist and discriminatory ustaša policies (lay-offs, expulsions etc.), as well as sanctions against those who committed crimes against the Serb population of eastern Herzegovina in the summer of 1941.

Between 1942 and mid-1943, Spužević, vicar fra Leo Petrović, fra Bonicije Rupčić and Mostar Serbs Milivoj Jelačić and Đorđe Obradović formed the Committee for the stricken persons, raising funds and food for the exiled, expelled, and vulnerable population in general. Most of the funds went to poverty-stricken Serbs of the area, which were discriminated and generally unwanted by the ustaša authorities.

In 1943 and 1944, ustaša authorities arrested, imprisoned and executed many of their opponents in Mostar area, especially the communists and anyone connected to Yugoslav partisans. Prominent pre-war members of the ustaša-banned Croatian Peasant Party were also targeted, for instance dr. Ivica Milaković and Blaž Slišković (killed in Jasenovac Concentration camp). Spužević was saved by an intervention of fra Leo Petrović, a prominent Franciscan friar well respected among the population and recognized as such by ustaša authorities. After this crackdown, in August 1944 guerilla Yugoslav partisans managed to evacuate Spužević from ustaša-held Mostar and bring him to the territory they controlled, after Herzegovina Communist Party chairman Vaso Miškin “Crni” organized an action together with fra Petrović, who chose to stay in Mostar and look after Spužević’s family. Usually ustaša would arrest and imprison or intern a family of someone who left to join the partisans, but Spužević’s family – thanks to fra Petrović - was an exception in Mostar. All three Spužević’s sons eventually left to join the partisans, too. Spužević's cousin, judge dr. Đuro Spužević, on the other hand, was a deputy county prefect of Vrhbosna county and later county prefect (Croatian: veliki župan) of Mostar-based Hum county in ustaša regime (1942-5).

Dr. Spužević was elected as a member of State Anti-fascist Council for the National Liberation of Bosnia and Herzegovina in 1944.

=== Communist Yugoslavia ===
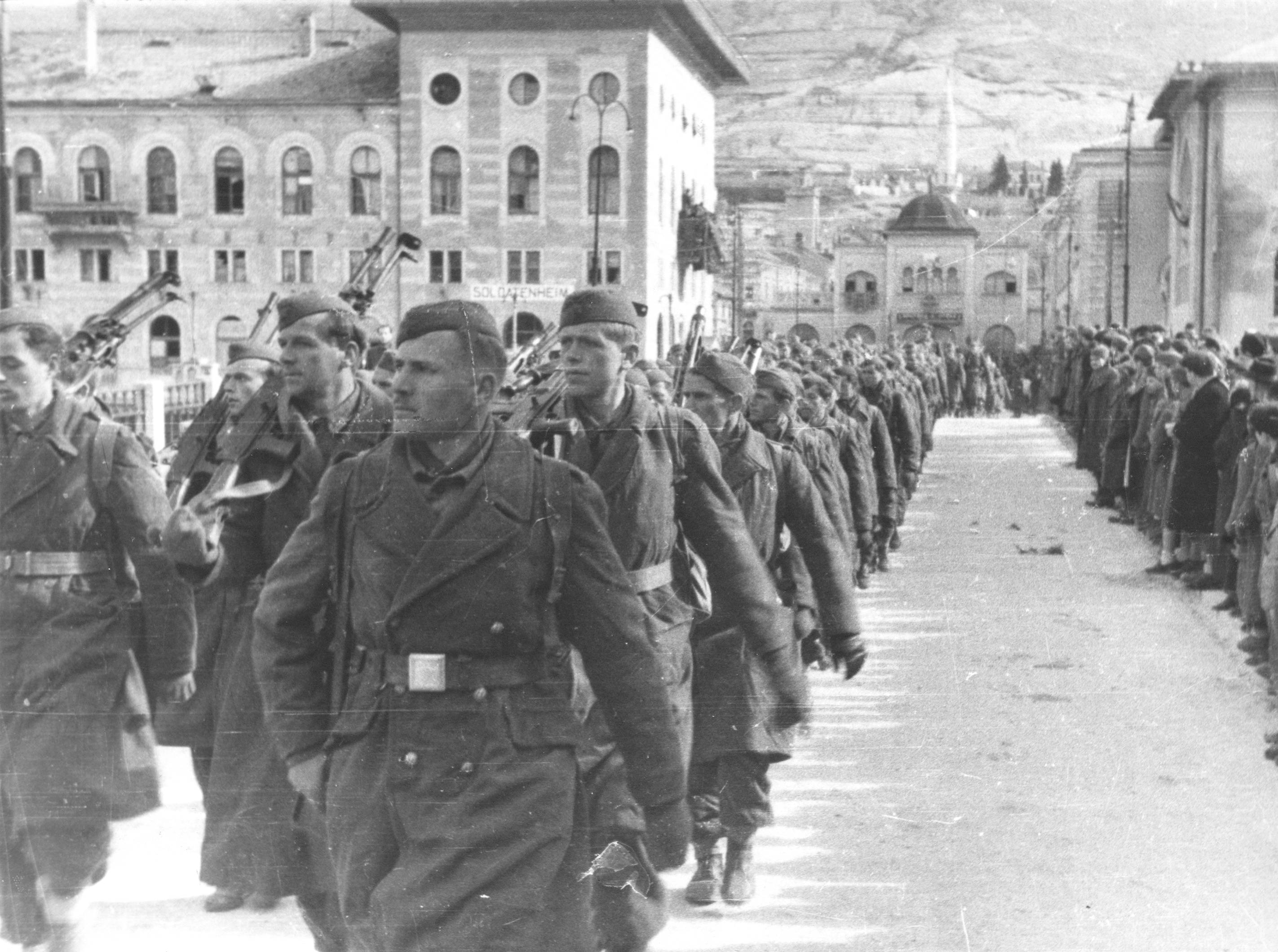
8th Dalmatian Partisan corps entering liberated Mostar, February 1945

After Mostar was liberated by the Partisans in February 1945, Spužević served as the vice-president of the county liberation committee, provisional authority for Mostar area. As a close friend of some prominent Mostar friars, he tried to intervene with other partisan authorities to enable the friars to exhume and rebury friars the partisans had shot in Široki Brijeg. Spužević also protested against the killings of the friars there, arguing that some of them were old and frail and most definitely did not carry arms or resist the partisans. His best friend, Franciscan provincial Leo Petrović was also shot in Mostar before Spužević entered the liberated town, while he was still in Čitluk. Spužević openly bemoaned this to the new authorities. Still, he expressed gratitude to the liberators of Mostar at a public rally. In front of Dalmatian and Herzegovinian partisan troops parading in Mostar, he decried those still not joining the National liberation army in their fight against the Axis, choosing instead to wait together with the fraction of pre-war Croatian Peasant Party and its chairman Vladko Maček.

After the partisans liberated Sarajevo and the war's end seemed imminent, ZAVNOBiH held its third session in Sarajevo at the end of April 1945, promulgating itself into the national assembly of Bosnia-Herzegovina and appointing the first national government. On April 27, a cabinet under prime minister Rodoljub Čolaković was formed. Dr. Spužević was appointed the minister of construction. Other Bosnian Croats in the government included Jakov Grgurić (deputy prime minister), Ante Babić (education), and Ante Martinović (forestry). Spužević's ministry was responsible for the organisation of extensive reconstruction of the war-torn country. In October 1945, he was elected to the governing board of the newly re-established Croatian cultural society "Napredak" in Sarajevo.

=== 1946 elections ===
For the first post-war Bosnia-Herzegovina elections in October 1946, United People’s Liberation Front decided to put Spužević on their ticket for Posušje-Široki Brijeg constituency, running for the seat of a deputy in the Constituent Assembly of Bosnia and Herzegovina. As the Communist Party in Posušje and Western Herzegovina wanted another lawyer, a long-time communist born in Posusje, dr. Ante (Tune) Ramljak^{A} to be on the ballot instead, a compromise solution was found and Ramljak and Spužević ran against each other in the constituency, both as People’s Front candidates. Spužević refused to have Marko Šoljić, a long-time communist and a Spanish civil war veteran as his running mate on his ticket, as the Communist Party suggested. Posušje communists described Spužević in their internal reports as connected to the friars and clerical elements, hostile to the communists and dr Ramljak. Spužević actively campaigned and canvassed his constituency, supported by the Catholic Church, but eventually lost to Ramljak by a landslide. After hearing the results, Spužević left Mostar.

== Legacy ==
Spužević has been largely forgotten in historiography and the public in general. On the other hand, after the breakup of Socialist Yugoslavia, a street in western part of Mostar was named after his cousin, Đuro (Đuka) Spužević, who was entrusted by ustaše regime with a position of a Hum county prefect during the war.

In the night of February 19, 2018, Bosnian Croat student activists, studying history at Mostar University, removed the street signs in a Mostar street named after Mile Budak, Ustaša ideologue, NDH government minister and the author of racial legislation in WWII (tried and executed in 1945 as a war criminal), replacing them with plaques “Cvitan Spužević Street.” The acting mayor of Mostar, Ljubo Bešlić, welcomed the action and commented that dr. Spužević deserves to have a street in Mostar. National and regional media welcomed the idea as well. Serb orthodox priest in Mostar, Radivoje Krulj, stated he was "thrilled" to have learned of the action and that Spužević's name reminds him of compassion and thankfulness.

=== Family ===
Spužević's cousin Đuro (Đuka) Spužević (1900–81) emigrated to Italy and then to South Africa in 1945, becoming a cultural and political leader of the Croat community there.

Spužević is a maternal great-grandfather of Bosnian Serb academic and historian, Vuk Bačanović.

== Notes ==
^A dr Antun (Tuna) Ramljak was a lawyer born in Ričine, Posušje municipality. Ramljak attended school in Mostar. As a supporter of the Communist Party, in interbellum Yugoslavia he defended many persecuted Croatian communists in court, most notably, Marko Orešković. Between 1936 and 1941 Ramljak was the chairman of »Hrvatska naklada«, Party's unofficial publishing house that published Izraz magazine. Having joined the People's Liberation Front in WW2, he became court secretary for Slavonia for the PLF authorities. Since October 1944, he worked as a government official in the Department of the Interior of the fledgling government of Croatia. After the war, in 1945, he was a member of the advisory committee on book censorship in the Ministry of Education of Croatia.
