= Cvijanović =

Cvijanović (Cyrillic script: Цвијановић) is a Serbian surname derived from the masculine given name Cvijan. Notable people with the surname include:

- Adam Cvijanovic (born 1960), American painter
- Goran Cvijanović (born 1986), Slovenian footballer
- Miroslav Cvijanović (born 1985), Slovenian footballer
- Zoran Cvijanović (born 1958), Serbian actor
- Željka Cvijanović (born 1967), politician from Bosnia and Herzegovina

== See also ==
- Cvitanović
