= HKD Napredak =

- Hrvatsko kulturno društvo Napredak
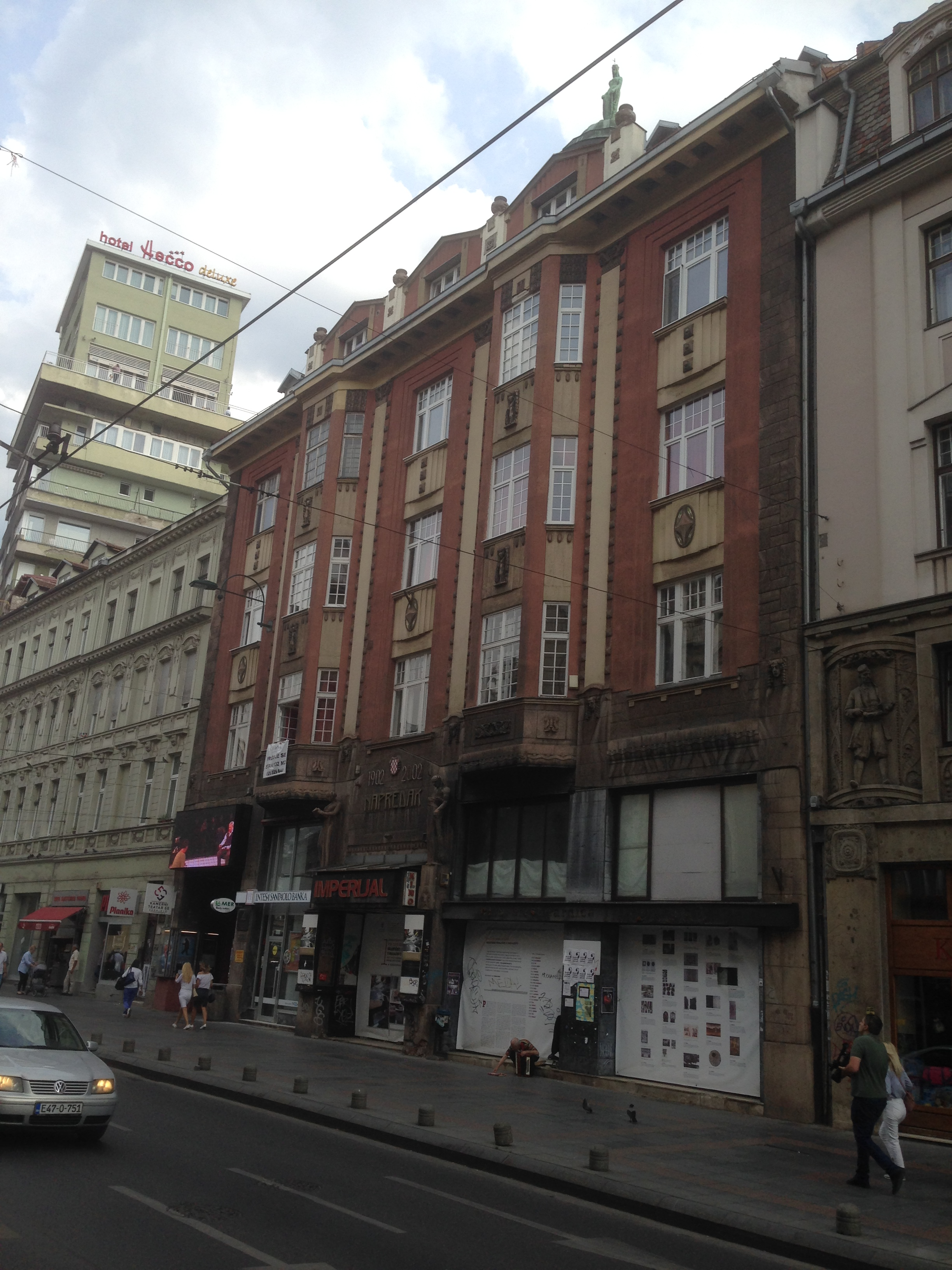
- Napredak Palace in Sarajevo, built in 1913, is listed as a National Monument of Bosnia and Herzegovina
- Formation: November 11, 1902
- Headquarters: Sarajevo, Bosnia and Herzegovina
- Members: c. 20,000 (1990)
- Website: www.napredak.com.ba

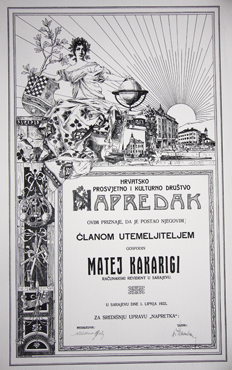
The Certificate received by all Founding Members of the HKD Napredak in 1922, this one is owned by the founding member, Matej Kakarigi

HKD Napredak (Croatian: Hrvatsko kulturno društvo Napredak, meaning "Croat Cultural Society 'Progress'") is a cultural society of Croats of Bosnia and Herzegovina.

== History ==
The "Croatian aid society for the needs of students in middle and higher schools from Bosnia and Herzegovina" (Croatian: Hrvatsko potporno društvo za potrebne đake srednjih i visokih škola uz Bosne i Hercegovine) was founded on the initiative of Augustin Zubac in Mostar on 14 September 1902, with the aim of assisting Croatian Catholic students. Already that year it had accumulated 376 members, including its first sponsor Josip Juraj Strossmayer, who was later joined by Graf Rudolf Normann-Ehrenfels of Valpovo. By 1903, membership had risen to 916, including 143 in Zagreb, 11 in Jastrebarsko and 10 in Samobor.

The same year, the "Croatian society for the placement of children in trades and business" (Croatian: Društvo za namještanje djece u zanate i trgovinu) was founded in Sarajevo. The idea for the society had come in 1900, and its statutes were drawn up by Tugomir Alaupović, Đuro Vrinjanin and Dušan Plavšić on 9 November 1902, with its first meeting on the 11th. Its first main meeting was held on 10 September 1904 in the Trebević building.

After three years of talks, the two groups united in 1907, taking on the current name, with headquarters in Sarajevo as Central Administration of Napredak (Croatian: Središnja Uprava Napretka).

During WWI, Napredak gradually lost supporters, falling into debt. In 1917, it had to cease publication of its flagship calendar. During the war, it housed 40 students in its own temporary unit until 1917.

On 3 December 1919, the new Zemaljska vlada za Bosnu i Hercegovinu gave the organisation its approval. On 17 November 1921, HKD Napredak received approval from the government of the Kingdom of the Serbs, Croats and Slovenes, and on 6 December permission to expand its activities throughout the kingdom. In 1922 all founding members received the certificates of the Society showing relevant symbols and images of the main buildings in different towns and cities.

Napredak's headquarters are in Sarajevo where the organization built the impressive Napredak Palace in 1913. The Napredak Palace Construction Board was formed in 1911. Its primary role was to facilitate construction, and to ensure further funding. The board members were as follows: Ante Tandarić, Anto Alaupović, Mijo Vučak, Ivan Renđec, Ljudevit Dvorniković, Nikola Krešić, Albert Draganić, Jozo Udovčić, Matej Kakarigi, Ivan Budimir, Dane Cvitković, Petar Maričić i Nikola Palandžić.

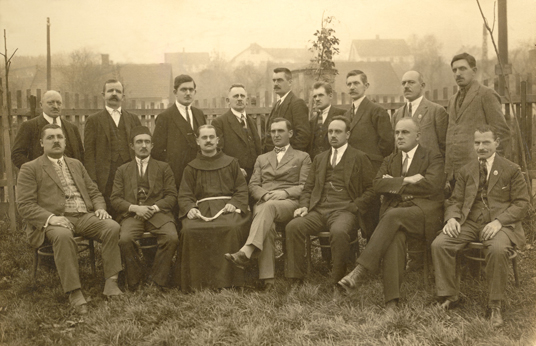
The Napredak Palace Board members in 1911

The society continued its work until 1949 when it was disbanded by Yugoslav authorities. It was reformed in 1990 with about 20,000 members under the leadership of its president Franjo Topić. Between 1990 and 2019, Napredak organized more than 9,000 events, and awarded 2,890 stipends.

The society's original purpose was to help educate youths by offering scholarships. The society broadened its aim to include preserving the Croat culture of all of Bosnia and Herzegovina. Napredak has dozens of branches all over the country as well as in Croatia.

== Famous people given scholarships by Napredak ==
- Ivo Andrić, Nobel Prize winner in literature
- Vladimir Prelog, Nobel Prize winner in chemistry

== Presidents ==
- Anto Palandžić (1907)
- Tugomir Alaupović (1907–1909)
- Antun Tandarić (1909–1921)
- Aleksa Đebić (1921–1923)
- Anto Alaupović (1923–1945)
- Vlado Čaldarević (1945–1949)
- Franjo Topić (1990–2019)
- Nikola Čiča (2019–)

== Acknowledgements ==
(incomplete list)

- Charter of the Republic of Croatia
- City of Sarajevo Award
- Sarajevo Canton Plaque

== See also ==
- NK SAŠK Napredak

== Bibliography ==
- Matić, Zdravko (2004-12-22). "Osnivanje i rad "Napretkovih" organizacija na području Hrvatskog primorja i Gorskog kotara (1928. - 1950.)" [The Foundation and Work of "Napredak" Organisations on the Territory of Hrvatsko Primorje and Gorski Kotar]. Časopis za suvremenu povijest (in Croatian). 36 (3): 1183–1204. ISSN 1848-9079.
