= Vitomir Lukić =

Yugoslav prose writer and pedagogue

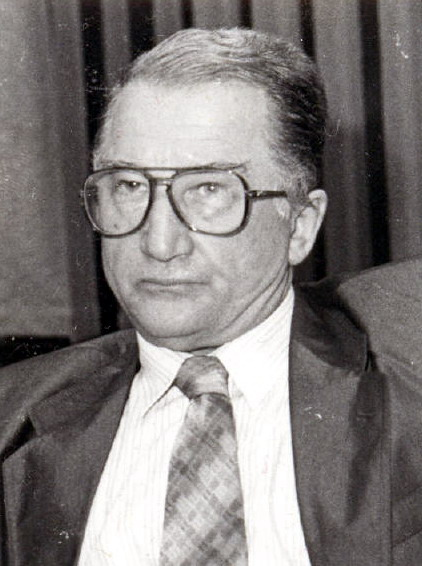
- Born: 24 September 1929; Zelenika, Herceg Novi, Montenegro
- Died: May 30, 1991 (aged 61)
- Resting place: Sarajevo, Bosnia and Herzegovina
- Citizenship: Yugoslavia
- Education: University of Sarajevo
- Writing career
- Language: Serbo-Croatian
- Genre: prose

Vitomir Lukić (Zelenika September 24, 1929 - Sarajevo, May 30, 1991), was a Yugoslav prose writer and pedagogue, considered to be one of the greatest writers to emerge from Bosnia and Herzegovina in the 20th century.

== Works ==
- "Soba za prolaznike" (Short stories, 1965, second edition 1997)
- "Album" (Novel, 1968)
- "Praznik stvari" (Poems, 1969)
- "Zaustavljeni kalendar" (Short stories and other prose works, 1970)
- "Životinje, ljudi" (Short stories and other prose works, 1973),
- "Sanovnik nasmijane duše" (Prose work, 1976, second edition 1997)
- "Seansa" (Short stories, 1981)
- "Noćni ekspres" (Selected works, 1984/85)
- "Hodnici svijetlog praha" (Novel, 1989)
- "Odlazak starog rezbara" (Short stories and other prose works, 2005)
