= Cvetanka Petrova =

Macedonian footballer

Personal information
- Date of birth: 7 November 1991 (age 35)
- Position: Goalkeeper

International career^{‡}
Years	Team	Apps	(Gls)
2010	North Macedonia U-19	3	(0)
2009–2010	North Macedonia	4	(0)
- ‡ National team caps and goals as of 11:02, 21 September 2021 (UTC)

Cvetanka Petrova (born 7 November 1991) is a Macedonian footballer who plays as a goalkeeper for the North Macedonia national team.

== International career ==
Petrova made her debut for the North Macedonia national team on 19 September 2009, against Slovakia.
