= Muhamed Hadžijahić =

Bosnian historian (1918–1986)

- Born: 6 February 1918; Sarajevo, Austria-Hungary (modern-day Bosnia and Herzegovina)
- Died: June 21, 1986 (aged 68); Sarajevo
- Resting place: Bare Cemetery, Sarajevo

Academic background
- Education: University of Zagreb
- Thesis: Pravni položaj Sarajeva u Otomanskoj carevini do 1850. godine (1965)

Academic work
- Discipline: History
- Institutions: ANU BiH

Muhamed Hadžijahić (Sarajevo, 6 February 1918 – Sarajevo, 21 June 1986), was Bosnian and Yugoslav historian, orientalist, and Ottomanist, doctor of law with main focus of interest in political history.

== Education ==
He finished elementary school, and high school in 1937, in Sarajevo. He, then, graduated in 1942 at the Faculty of Law in Zagreb, where he received his doctorate in 1965, with the thesis Legal position of Sarajevo in the Ottoman Empire until 1850. He has been writing since his early youth, and already at the age of 16, he published his first work in Novi Behar about Alija Đerzelez epic folk songs. He graduated from the Faculty of Law in Zagreb, in 1942. As a student he began to study legal history. After graduating, he started working in Sarajevo, then Zagreb, Raša near Labin, Mostar, Brčko, Gradačac, Vogošća and finally in Sarajevo again.

== Career ==
He was especially active in writing in all areas during the NDH, while also working as a censor in the General Directorate for Propaganda. However, since 1941 and the beginning of the WWII in Yugoslavia, he joined NOP as a covert operative associate in Sarajevo. From the autumn of 1942 he is in continuous contact with the leadership of the communist underground resistance movement in Zagreb.

During the WWII he wrote for Hrvatska enciklopedija (1941–42, 1945), Nova uzdanica calendar, El Hidaje, Zagreb's Croatian people, Zagreb's Croatian daily, Hrvatsko kolo, Sarajevo's Osvit, Spremnosti, Muslim yearbook Hrvat, a post-war encyclopedia of Yugoslavia, various Muslim magazines, but also Catholic (Dobri Pastir, Croatica Christiana Periodica) ones too.

After the war, from 1945 until 1949, he worked in the information office of the Presidency of the Government of the People's Republic of Croatia, from 1949 to 1950 as a lawyer at the General Directorate of Coal in Zagreb, and from 1950 to '51 as a legal officer at Raša coal mines. From 1951 until 1955, he worked in the District Court and the State Secretariat for Judicial Administration of the People's Republic of Bosnia and Herzegovina in Sarajevo, and also as a judge in Mostar, Brčko and Gradačac. From 1955 until 1960, he worked in the supervisory board of the Municipality of Gradačac, and from 1960 to '64 in the Municipal Assembly of Sarajevo-Centar. From 1964 to '65 he worked as a lawyer at the Institute of Economics and then from 1965 to '67 at the Institute for Social Management of the University of Sarajevo. In 1967 he took position at the company "Tito" in Vogošća. Between 1967 and 1968 he worked at the city's Institute for the Protection and Maintenance of Cultural Monuments in Sarajevo and from 1968 until his retirement in 1978 at the Academy of Sciences and Arts of Bosnia and Herzegovina, where he was first elected senior research associate and secretary of the Commission for the History of the Peoples of Bosnia and Herzegovina, and in 1976 scientific advisor.

He chaired the council of the Gazi Husrev-beg Library in Sarajevo in 1971.

In his works he dealt with Aljamiado literature (Bosnian: adžamijska književnost); history of Bosnia and Herzegovina, especially from 9th to 10th century and from 18th to 19th century; the Bosnian Church and expansion Islam in Bosnia; the Hamzevian movement; the position of cities in the Ottoman Empire. He also wrote several bibliographic articles.

== Bibliography ==
Bibliography of Hadžijahić contains more than 400 items. He is a co-author of the books:

- Islam i muslimani u Bosni i Hercegovini (Sarajevo 1977, 1991),
- ABC Muslimana (Sarajevo 1990).
- Narodne pjesme o Đerzelez Aliji. Priredio: Muhamed Hadžijahić. Sarajevo: Štamparija Omer Šehić, 1934.
- Gradja za povijest narodne poezije muslimana iz Bosne u XVI, XVII. i XVIII. stoljeću, 1935.
- Hrvatska muslimanska književnost prije 1878. godine, Sarajevo 1938
- Posebnost Bosne i Hercegovine i stradanja Muslimana. Rukopis dostavljen savezničkim snagama 1944. Sarajevo 1991.
- Prvi pokušaji štampanja radova bosanskih muslimana, (Osman Sokolović and Muhamed Hadžijahić, 1963)
- Pravni položaj Sarajeva u Otomanskom carstvu do 1850 godine, (doktorska disertacija na Pravnom fakultetu u Zagrebu, 1964)
- Die Kaempfe der Ajane in Mostar bis zum Jahre 1833., 1969.
- Pitanje vjerodostojnosti Sabora na Duvanjskom polju, 1970.
- Italija i bosanski muslimani u proljeće 1920., 1972.
- Prilog Skarićevoj hipotezi o porijeklu stećaka, 1971.
- Neki tipovi povlaštenih gradova u turskom feudalizmu, 1974.
- O progonu Hamzevija u Bosni 1573. godine, (Adem Handžić and Muhamed Hadžijahić, 1974)
- Od tradicije do identiteta: Geneza nacionalnog pitanja bosanskih muslimana, Sarajevo 1974, Zagreb 1990
- Porijeklo bosanskih Muslimana, objavljeno 1990.

He collaborated on anthologies:

- Zbornik radova, studija i prikaza Ekonomskog instituta Univerziteta u Sarajevu (Sarajevo 1965),
- Zbornik radova Prvog kongresa za istoriju zdravstvene kulture (Sarajevo 1970),
- Nacionalni odnosi danas - Prilog sagledavanju nacionalnih odnosa u Bosni i Hercegovini (Sarajevo 1971),
- Uloga džamije Mehmed-bega Stočanina u formiranju Gornjeg Vakufa (Gornji Vakuf 1971),
- 1941 u istoriji naroda Bosne i Hercegovine (Sarajevo 1973),
- Bosansko-hercegovačka književna hrestomatija (Sarajevo 1974),
- Običajno pravo i samouprave na Balkanu i u susednim zemljama (Beograd 1974).

== Publications ==
He wrote for:

- Hrvatska enciklopedija (1941–42, 1945),
- Enciklopedija Jugoslavije (1955, 1980);

as well as in magazines, newspapers, and other:

- Novi behar (1932–37, 1939–40),
- Islamski svijet (1933–34),
- Narodna uzdanica, kalendar (1933–35, 1939, 1941, 1943),
- Mladost (Zagreb 1934),
- Jugoslavenski list (1936, 1939–40),
- Muslimanska svijest (1936),
- Napredak (Sarajevo 1936, 1939),
- Obzor (1936–39, 1941),
- Zbornik za narodni život i običaje Južnih Slavena (1936, 1939),
- El Hidaje (1937, 1939–42),
- Napredak, kalendar (1937),
- Jadranski dnevnik (1938),
- Hrvatski narod (Zagreb 1939),
- Hrvatski dnevnik (Zagreb 1940–41),
- Mjesečnik. Glasilo pravničkoga društva u Zagrebu (1940–41),
- Narodna pravda (1941),
- Hrvatsko kolo (1942),
- Osvit (Sarajevo 1942),
- Spremnost (1942),
- Hrvat. Muslimanski godišnjak (1943),
- Slovensko bratstvo (Beograd 1948),
- Historijski zbornik (1949–51, 1960, 1962, 1968, 1972–73, 1977, 1982),
- Pregled (1953, 1961, 1965–66, 1968, 1970, 1972, 1975–76),
- Prilozi za orijentalnu filologiju (1953, 1955, 1961, 1974, 1980–81),
- Sloboda (1953), Život (1953, 1968, 1973, 1976),
- Dobri Pastir (1959, 1974–75),
- Historijski pregled (Beograd 1959),
- Glasnik Vrhovnog islamskog starješinstva (1961, 1970–74, 1979, 1981, 1983),
- Südost-Forschungen (München 1961–62, 1968, 1983),
- Bibliotekarstvo (1963–64, 1967),
- Godišnjak Društva istoričara BiH (1964, 1968), Naš svijet (1966),
- Prilozi za proučavanje istorije Sarajeva (1966, 1974),
- Politika (Beograd 1967),
- Takvim (1967–68, 1970–72, 1976–79, 1982),
- Odjek (1968),
- Radovi ANUBiH (1968),
- Forum (1970, 1985),
- Godišnjak Centra za balkanološka ispitivanja ANUBiH (1970),
- Jugoslovenski istorijski časopis (Beograd 1970),
- Anali Gazi Husrev-begove biblioteke (1972, 1974, 1982–83, 1985),
- Zadarska revija (1972),
- Godišnjak Instituta za izučavanje jugoslavenskih književnosti u Sarajevu (1973),
- Radovi Muzeja Zenica (1973),
- Prilozi Instituta za istoriju radničkog pokreta u Sarajevu (1974–76, 1981),
- Sociologija (Beograd 1975),
- Zeitschrift für Balkanologie (München 1975),
- Nova et vetera (1979, 1983, 1985),
- Članci i građa za kulturnu istoriju istočne Bosne (1980),
- Istorijski zapisi (1980),
- Croatica Christiana periodica (1985),
- Dubrovnik (1985),
- Književna revija (1988).
