= Cvitan =

Cvitan is a Croatian surname and masculine given name.

Notable people with the surname include:

- Antonella Cvitan (born 1980), Swedish golfer
- Dinko Cvitan (born 1958), Croatian lawyer
- Ognjen Cvitan (born 1961), Croatian chess player
- Onesin Cvitan (born 1939), Croatian jurist and politician

Notable people with the given name include:

- Cvitan Galić (1909–1944), Bosnian Croat pilot
- Cvitan Spužević (c. 1885 – ?), Bosnian Croat politician
