= Cvijan =

Cvijan (Serbian Cyrillic: Цвијан, Serbian pronunciation: [tsʋijan]) is a Slavic surname and given name. It is most prevalent in Serbia.

== Notable people ==
Notable people with this name include:

=== Surname ===
- Vladimir Cvijan (1976–2018), Serbian politician

=== Given name ===
- Cvijan Milošević (born 1963), Yugoslavian footballer
- Cvijan Šarić (fl. 1652–1668), Serbian soldier

== See also ==
- Cvijanović
