= Cvetan Grozdanov =

Macedonian art historian (1936–2018)

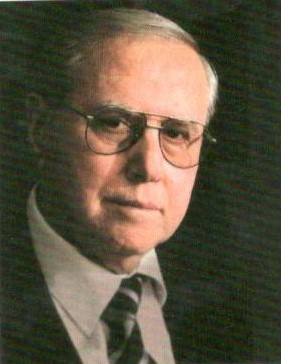
- Cvetan Grozdanov
- Born: Цветан Грозданов; 5 March 1936; Ohrid, Kingdom of Yugoslavia
- Died: 30 March 2018 (aged 82)
- Occupation: art historian

Cvetan Grozdanov (Macedonian: Цветан Грозданов) (5 March 1936 – 30 March 2018) was an art historian from Macedonia. He was born in Ohrid, Kingdom of Yugoslavia. Grozdanov was a president of the Macedonian Academy of Sciences and Arts in period 2004–2008. He was a member of the Serbian Academy of Science and Arts since 2003.
