= Alija Isaković =

Bosnian writer, essayist and lexicographer

- Born: 15 January 1932; Stolac, Littoral Banovina, Kingdom of Yugoslavia
- Died: 14 March 1997 (aged 65); Sarajevo, Bosnia and Herzegovina
- Resting place: Ferhadija Mosque, Sarajevo

Alija Isaković (15 January 1932 – 14 March 1997) was a Bosnian writer, essayist, publicist, playwright, and lexicographer of the Bosnian language.

Isaković studied Slavic languages and literature and was a graduate of the University of Sarajevo. Isaković was also notable for his works treating Bosnian literary history; asserting the special character and identity of Bosniaks.

== Early life ==
Isaković was born to a Bosniak family in Stolac in January 1932, while modern-day Bosnia and Herzegovina was a part of the Kingdom of Yugoslavia. He was raised a Muslim and, as a child, lived in Bitunja, a village located in his birth city.

He attended schools in his native Stolac, as well as Zagreb, Crikvenica, Pančevo, Belgrade, and Sarajevo.

== Career ==
He wrote the screenplay for a 1983 film version of the Bosniak folk ballad Hasanaginica. The film's script was turned into a play, directed by Sulejman Kupusović, that premiered in 1988.

In 1972, he released an anthology of Bosniak literature called Biserje (Pearls). Isaković's Pearls, it was said, was a pioneering project in establishing the delicate ethnic Bosniak literature.

== Bosnian War ==
During the Bosnian War of the 1990s, Isaković was one of the speakers at the First Assembly of Bosniaks (Prvi Bošnjački sabor), one of the most important events in modern political history of Bosniaks, held in the besieged city of Sarajevo between 27–28 September 1993.

== Personal life ==
Isaković was a friend of the first Bosnian president, Alija Izetbegović, painter Mersad Berber and he knew the Yugoslavia prime minister Branko Mikulić.

Isaković died 14 March 1997, at the age of 65 in Sarajevo and was buried in the graveyard of a mosque there.

== Legacy ==
An elementary school in Prozor-Rama, Bosnia and Herzegovina was named after him.

== Works ==
- Sunce o desno rame (Sun on the Right Shoulder, 1963)
- Semafor (Stoplight, 1966)
- Avdo Karabegović Hasanbegov: Izabrane pjesme (1967)
- Prednost imaju koji ulaze (Priority is Given to Those Who Enter, 1971)
- Građa za bibliografiju Muslimanske književnosti 1883-1971 (1972)
- Biserje (Pearls, 1972)
- Hodoljublje (1973)
- Građa za bibliografiju bosansko-hercegovačkog (1842-1970) (1973)
- Edhem Mulabdić: Izabrana djela (1974)
- Hasanaginica, 1774-1974 (1975)
- Bibliografija radova o Hasanaginici 1774-1974 (1975)
- Taj čovjek (That Man, 1975)
- Osman - Aziz (Osman Nuri Hadžić i Ivan Miličević): Izabrana djela (1980)
- Krajnosti (Extremes, 1981)
- Hasanaginica (1982)
- Pobuna materije (Rebellion Matters, 1985)
- Nasrudin Hodža (1986)
- Jednom (Once, 1987)
- Neminovnosti (Inevitability, 1987)
- Ahmed Muradbegović: Izabrana djela (1987)
- Lijeve priče (Left Stories, 1990)
- O »nacionaliziranju« muslimana. 101 godina afirmiranje i negiranja nacionalnog identiteta Muslimana (1990)
- Biserje. Izbor iz muslimanske književnosti. Drugo, prošireno, izdanje (1992)
- Rječnik karakteristične leksike u Bosanskome jeziku (Dictionary of Characteristic Lexicon of the Bosnian Language, 1992)

Screenplays

- Hasanaginica (1983)
