= Hasanaginica =

17th-century South Slavic folk ballad

Hasanaginica Asanaginica
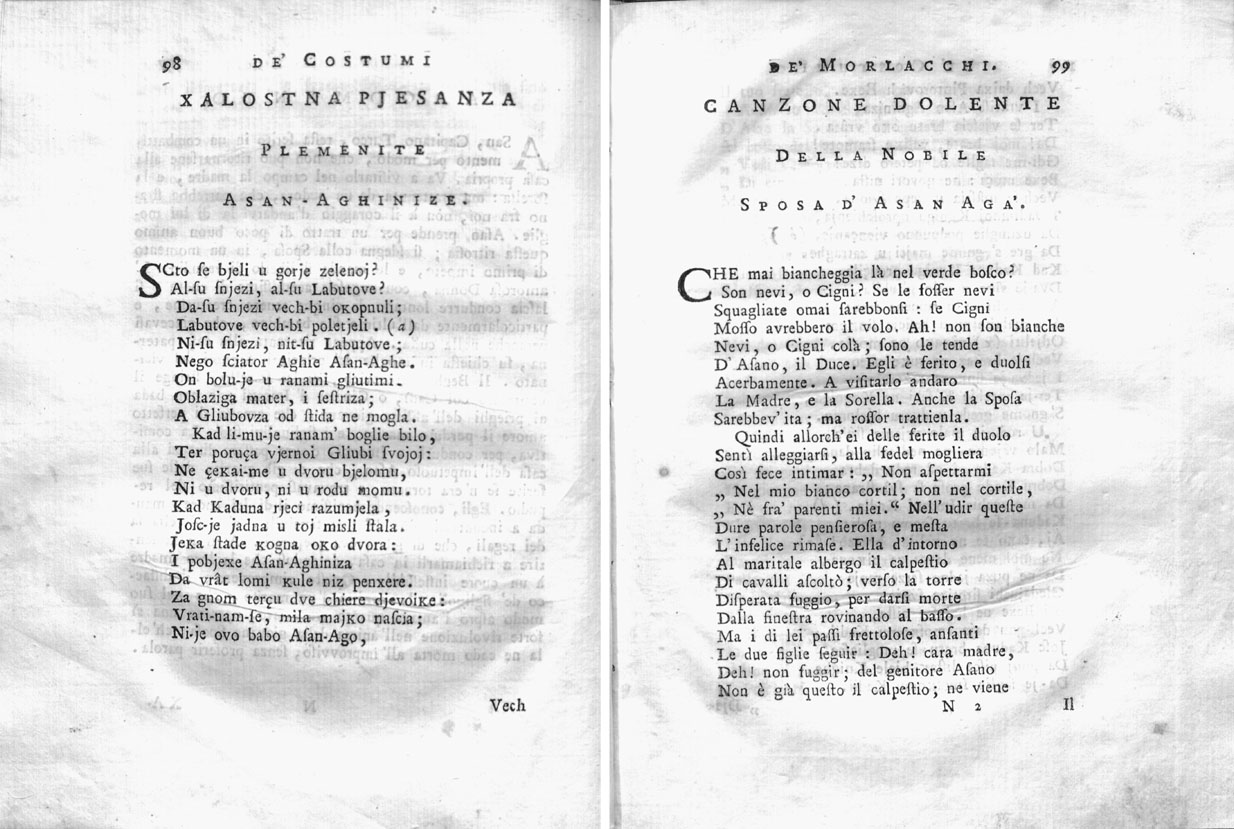
- The Mourning Song of the Noble Wife of the Hasan Aga, the first publication of the ballad was in 1774 by Alberto Fortis in his work Viaggio in Dalmazia.
- Created: 1646–49
- Location: Imotski, Bosnia Eyalet, Ottoman Empire
- Author: South Slavic folk ballad
- Purpose: Mourning song

Hasanaginica (pronounced [xasanǎginit͡sa]), sometimes rendered as Asanaginica and first published as The Mourning Song of the Noble Wife of the Hasan Aga, is a South Slavic folk ballad, created during the period of 1646–49, in the region of Imotski, which at the time was a part of the Bosnia Eyalet of the Ottoman Empire. The author of the poem, whose premise takes place in a Bosnian Muslim cultural context, is unknown.

== Publication history ==
The ballad was transmitted for years in oral form until it was written and published in 1774 by Italian traveler and ethnographer Alberto Fortis in his book Viaggio in Dalmazia ('Journey to Dalmatia') after his travel through Dalmatia in 1770. During his travels, he discovered what he called a "Morlach ballad", the Morlachs being a people from the region. Fortis's book was criticised by Croatian writer Ivan Lovrić, who accused Fortis of many factual errors in his response, Notes on 'Travels in Dalmatia' of Abbe Alberto Fortis, which he then attempted to rectify.

The ballad remained part of the living oral tradition long after its publication. Among the songs collected by Milman Parry in 1933–1935 are five versions of the story, four of which were taken down by dictation from Muslim women in or around Gacko.

It was translated to German by Johann Wolfgang Goethe in approximately 1775, first appearing anonymously as Klaggesang von der edlen Frauen des Asan Aga in 1778 in Johann Gottfried Herder's collection of Stimmen der Völker in Liedern (or Volkslieder). It appeared with Goethe's signature in his eighth edition of collected works (1789).

Walter Scott was the second foreign author to translate Hasanaginica in 1798 under the title "Lamentation of the Faithful Wife of Asan Aga", from the German of Goethe. Other British translators soon followed suit, including Sir John Bowring, James Clarence Mangan, W. Edmondstone Aytoun, Edgar Alfred Bowring, Mary Ann Burt, George Bancroft, Owen Meredith, Edward Chawner, William Gibson, Maximilian A. Mügge.

It was translated into Russian (Pushkin, 1835, a beginning part, and Akhmatova, 1950s, in full), French (Mérimée, 1827 and Mickiewicz, 1841), and other languages, becoming an integral part of the world literary heritage already in the 18th century. Eventually Hasanaginica has been translated into more than 40 languages. It is considered a part of the shared Serbo-Croatian (Bosnian, Croatian and Serbian) literary heritage, and holds a particular place in the Bosniak cultural canon, where it is regarded as the most famous Bosniak folk ballad.

== Setting and plot ==
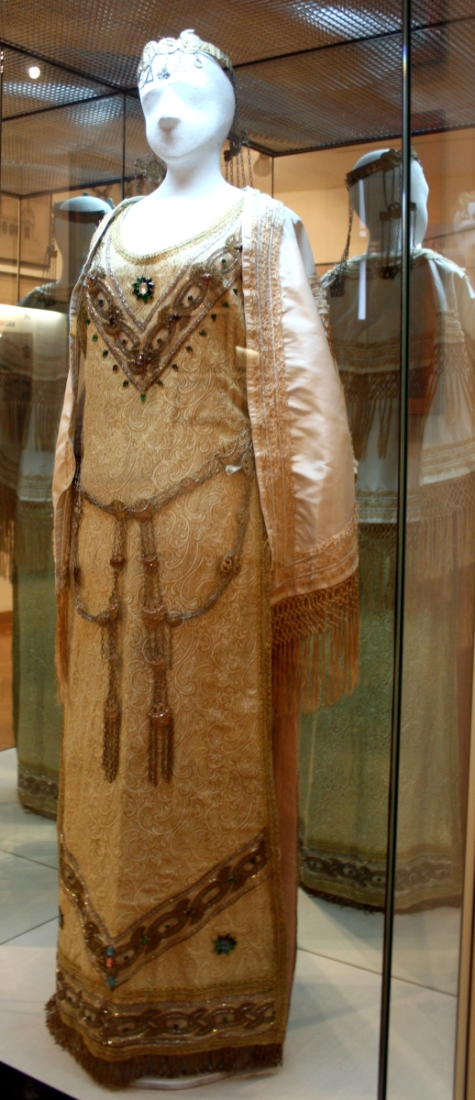
A dress worn by actress Nina Vavra in a 1909 production

Hasanaginica, "The Mourning Song of the Noble Wife of the Hasan Aga", is a ballad about the Muslim family Arapović in Dalmatia. The incidents take place along the Eyalet of Bosnia's frontier in Vrdol (today Zagvozd), near the Biokovo mountains of Dalmatia, where the lord (Turkish: ağa) Hasan Arapović had large estates. The ruins of the Hasan's towers exist today, as well as the place where Hasanaginica is presumed to be buried, near the ruins, on the southwestern slopes of the Blue Lake.

The ballad relates that following a battle, whilst lying wounded, Hasan-aga summons his wife, Fatima, who was unwilling to accompany him to the battlefield. Deeply angered and in pain, Hasan-aga sends his wife a message ordering her to leave his castle without their children. Despite pleading with her brother, who brings her the message and the divorce papers, Hasan-aga's wife is ousted from her home and her brother arranges her to be married to a wealthy kadı. As a last wish before the marriage, she asks her brother for a long veil so that she does not see her children as the wedding procession passes by her old castle. Ultimately, her children see her and call out for her. As she stops to bid them farewell one last time, she dies of sorrow.

== Linguistic and historical background ==
The poem's language is termed by Fortis as "Illyrian" (meaning South Slavic), which is a name that was in use before the term Serbo-Croatian. The version published by Fortis was probably copied from an ikavian text and changed in accordance with the style of language spoken in Dubrovnik. It combines mostly ijekavian and some ikavian forms, and includes misspellings. Serbian philologist and linguist Vuk Karadžić (1787–1864), who never actually heard the poem sung by a folk singer, changed Fortis's transcription to create a more Serbian version which would reflect his codification of the language.

The meter of the ballad is classical South Slavic decasyllable or 10-syllable verse, translated by Goethe as trochaic pentameter.

The name Hasanaginica reflects the contemporary status of women as socially dependent on men, being identified only by the husband's name, and not by her own given name.

There is much debate about whether the ballad was purely poetical and fictional, or based on real people and events. However, the following people did actually exist and are believed to be the basis of the ballad:

- Hasan-aga Arapović – An Ottoman ağa and Ottoman Bosnian frontiersman
- Fatima Arapović (née Pintorović) – Hasan-aga's wife
- Pintorović-beg – An Ottoman bey and Fatima's brother

As concluded by Bosnian writer Alija Isaković (1932–1997) in his 1975 monograph, the poem originated in the Imotski frontier. This area was known as Morlachia during the 15th century. Hasan-aga held courts in Vrdovo (modern-day Zagvozd) and Župa (villages on the Biokovo northern slopes), and belonged to the Arapović clan, whose descendants still live in Ljubuški, Bosnia and Herzegovina.

== Adaptations ==
Hasanaginica was the only authentic ballad included into La Guzla, an 1827 literary hoax of Prosper Mérimée.

In 1909, Milan Ogrizović penned a three-part play, adapting the story for the theater.

A film entitled Hasanaginica was made in 1967 starring Milena Dravić and Rade Marković. This was followed in 1983 by a Yugoslav television film featuring Žarko Laušević and Aleksandra Nikolić.

In 2000, an opera based on Hasanaginica premiered at the National Theatre of Sarajevo and was later released on CD. The libretto was written by Nijaz Alispahić and the composer was Asim Horozić.

Hasanaginica by TV Sarajevo was a TV film with Nada Đurevska in the title role, Josip Pejaković as Hasan Aga and Miralem Zupčević as Beg Pintorović.

In 2006, Hasanaginica premiered at the Croatian National Theatre in Zagreb. Mustafa Nadarević directed and played the lead role while Ljupčo Konstantinov composed the music.

In 2009, Hasanaginica premiered at the Serbian National Theatre. It was directed by Ivana Dragutinović Maričić, conducted by Mladen Jagušt, and composed by Rastislav Kambasković.

== Sources ==
- Caciur, Dana (2015). "Considerations regarding the Morlachs migrations from Dalmatia to Istria and the Venetian settlement policy during the 16th century". Balcanica Posnaniensia Acta et Studia. 22 (1): 57–70. doi:10.14746/bp.2015.22.5.
- Matejka, Ladislav (1986). Serbo-Croatian Oral and Written Verbal Art: Contacts and Conflicts. Edizioni dell'Ateneo.
- Michael Branch; Celia Hawkesworth (1994). The uses of tradition: a comparative enquiry into the nature, uses and functions of oral poetry in the Balkans, the Baltic and Africa. School of Slavonic and East European Studies, University of London. ISBN 978-0-903425-38-4.
- Ćurčin, Milan (1932). "Goethe and Serbo-Croat Ballad Poetry". The Slavonic and East European Review. 11 (31). Modern Humanities Research Association and University College London, School of Slavonic and East European Studies: 126–134. JSTOR 4202745.
- Isaković, Alija (1975). Hasanaginica. Svjetlost.
- Burkhart, Dagmar (2006). "Paradoxical communication: The Bosnian oral ballad 'Hasanaginica' as a pretext for literary texts". Russian Literature. 59 (1): 25–39. doi:10.1016/j.ruslit.2006.01.002.
