= Muhamed Bekir Kalajdžić =

Bosnian writer, bookseller and publisher

- Born: 25 September 1892; Mostar, Bosnia Vilayet, Ottoman Empire
- Died: 10 September 1963 (aged 70); Sarajevo, SR Bosnia and Herzegovina, Yugoslavia

Muhamed Bekir Kalajdžić (22 October 1892 – 10 September 1963) was a Bosnian writer, bookseller and publisher, who founded the journal Biser as a teenager. The first issue of the magazine was published 1 June 1912.

He was a fighter for the emancipation and preservation of Bosniak literary work and their heritage and culture.

== Early life ==
Kalajdžić was born in the city Mostar, Bosnia and Herzegovina, where he grew up and was educated, completed maktab and two years of trade school. After being expelled from school twice for behavioral issues, Kalajdžić bought a printing press and worked towards opening a bookstore, with the aim of collecting and preserving Bosniak, Turkish and Arabic literary works.

== Biser ==
Front page of the first issue of Biser, published 1 June 1912.

In Mostar he lived with a group of young Bosniak writers; Abdurezak Hifzi Bjelevac, Husein Dubravić, Salih-beg Bakamović, Mirhab Karišiković, Omer Balić and Muhamed Behlilović. With their assistance, Kalajdžić established the first Bosniak bookstore and print shop in Mostar on 1 December 1911, with a branch in Trebinje.

The group was a strong support system for Kalajdžić as a publisher and young store-owner. On 1 June 1912 he launched the magazine Biser, first as a monthly magazine, and in 1913 in a bimonthly format, intended to be a non-political replacement for the defunct political magazine Behar. One of the most important moves in Kalajdžić's publishing and editorial work was hiring poet Musa Ćazim Ćatić who wrote poetry and essays for the paper as well as contributing translations of numerous Turkish and Arabic studies and books for the Muslim Library that Kalajdžić had established. The main theme of these publications was Islam and Bosniak culture, but also works of literature, didactics and textbooks.

The First World War interrupted the publishing business from 1914 until 1918, when Kalajdžić started issuing Biser again to avoid being drafted into the army. All production of the paper ended in early 1919.

== Death ==
Kalajdžić died aged 70 of an illness in Sarajevo on 10 September 1963. He was buried the following day in front of a Sarajevo mosque.
