= Biser =

Biser may refer to:

- Biser (given name)
- Biser (magazine), a 1912–1919 Bosnian cultural magazine
- Biser, Bulgaria, a village in Haskoro Province, Bulgaria
- Biser, Russia, an urban locality (a settlement) in Gornozavodsky District of Perm Krai, Russia
- Biser Point, a rocky point in Antarctica
- Daniel S. Biser (1801–1877), American politician
