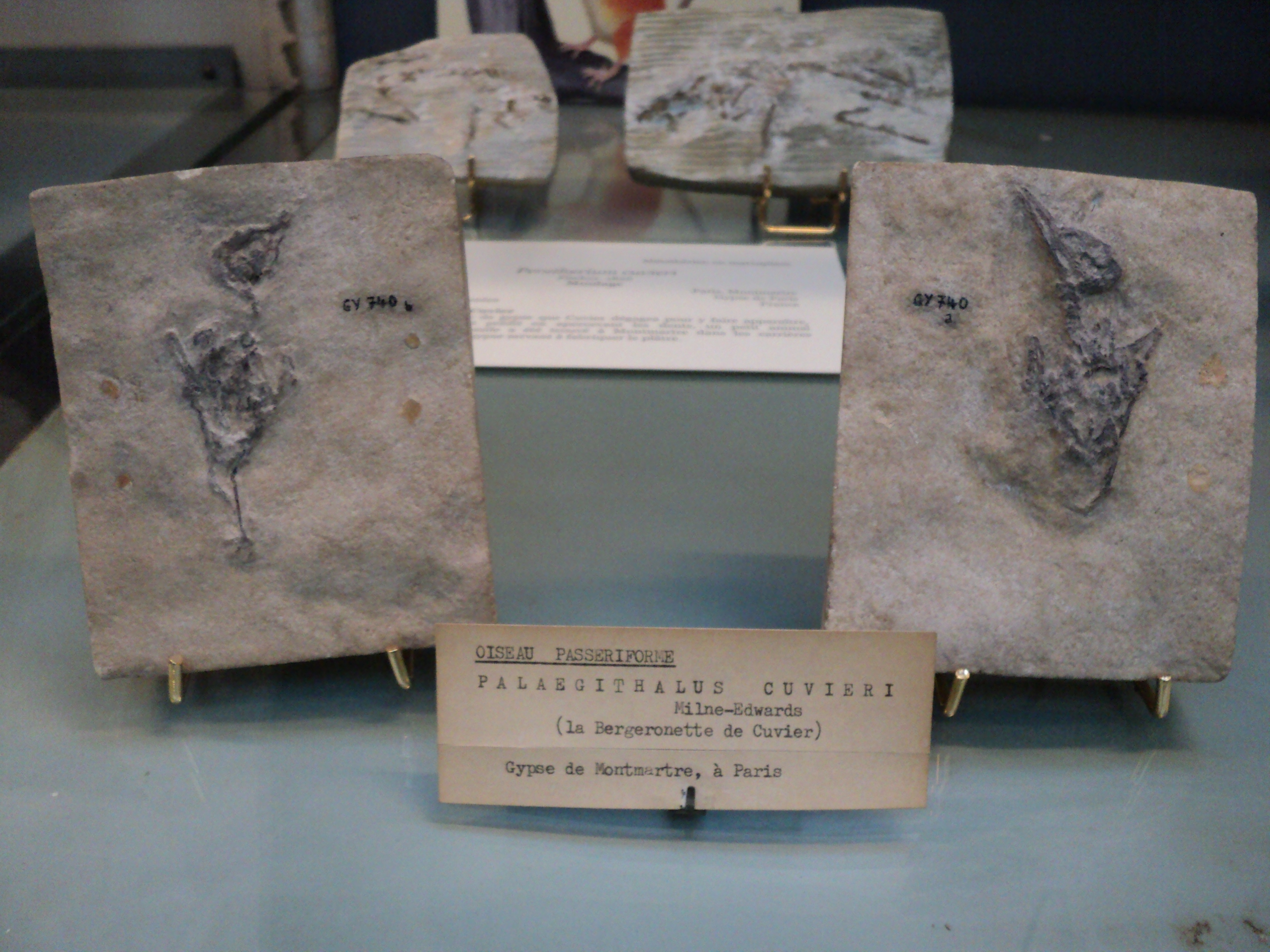
- Counter-print and footprint of the fossil, on display in a display case in the Paleontology Gallery of the National Museum of Natural History in Paris, France.

Scientific classification
- Kingdom: Animalia
- Phylum: Chordata
- Class: Aves
- Order: Passeriformes
- Family: Paridae
- Genus: †Palaegithalus; Milne-Edwards, 1869
- Species: †P. cuvieri

Binomial name
- †Palaegithalus cuvieri Gervais, 1852

= Palaegithalus =

Species of bird

Palaegithalus is an extinct monotypic genus containing the only species Palaegithalus cuvieri, sometimes referred to as Cuvier's wagtail, is an extinct species of bird from the Upper Eocene, about 34 to 37 million years ago. This small long-legged bird was formally described by Paul Gervais in 1852, from an "ornitholite" found in 1781 in the quarries of Montmartre and previously studied by Robert de Lamanon, Alberto Fortis and Georges Cuvier, the specific epithet being dedicated to the latter.

The taxon was first placed by Gervais in the genus Sitta (nuthatches), but its membership in the group Sittidae was later disputed. Transferred for a time to the Paridae or Motacillidae (earning it the nickname of wagtail), it seems in reality not to belong to the order Passeriformes (passerines). If its systematic placement is still uncertain because of the poor condition of the fossil, the species is at least placed in its own genus, Palaegithalus, placed in the family Paridae or related to Sylphornithidae, an Eocene group close to the root of the order Piciformes and whose members are characterized by an extremely long and thin tarsometatarsus.

== Taxonomy ==
=== Morphology ===
The only known fossil is a skeleton in a very poor state of preservation: little can be said of the anatomy of P. cuvieri.

According to mammalologist, ornithologist, and carcinologist Alphonse Milne-Edwards, the head is voluminous, with the cranial region well developed. The beak is small and not very long. The tarsometatarsus measures 1.5 cm (0.59 in), the tibia 2.3 cm (0.91 in). The humerus measures 1.3 cm (0.51 in), the ulna 1.4 cm (0.55 in) and the metacarpus 0.8 cm (0.31 in).

German palaeontologist Gerald Mayr likens the fossil to the Sylphornithidae, described as small, long-legged birds characterized by an extremely long and thin tarsometatarsus, the distal end of which is very wide and bears small trochleas.

=== History of the specimen ===
On November 2, 1781, during a lithological walk in the gypsum quarries of Montmartre, the chemist Jean Darcet recovered "a petrified bird of the most beautiful conservation" - which would otherwise probably have been destroyed or sold by the workers of the plaster quarries - made up of an impression and a counter-impression. He entrusted these objects to the naturalist Robert de Lamanon, as well as the task of communicating this discovery. Lamanon described the fossil at length in 1782 in Observations Observations and Memoirs on Physics, Natural History and Arts and Crafts, accompanying his commentary with a drawing, without however giving it a name. The associated drawing clearly shows traces of feathers on one of the wings, unfolded, and on the tail, but the author specifies that these dander have left only a diffuse trace.

Alberto Fortis considered the discovery inconclusive. After Darcet authorized him to study the specimen, he wrote in 1800 that it was uncertain whether this ornitholite originated from a gypsum layer or whether it resulted from a concretion of more recent origin. Moreover, according to Fortis, the drawing associated with the writings of Lamanon is not faithful to the object, and "contributed to accrediting a fact at least very questionable", so that he publishes a second reproduction, exaggerating the inequalities of the rock and decreasing the impressions of the bones. Fortis sees it as a frog or a toad, and denies the existence of bird fossils of ancient date.

In 1812, Georges Cuvier, father of paleontology as a science, mentions again this fossil in the volume 3 of his work on "Fossil bones". For him, if the imagination of Lamanon had probably helped him to see feathers in the wing and in the tail of the fossil, it does not remain about it less than the reserves of Fortis are exaggerated and that the object constitutes well an ornitholith. One of the two wings is in good condition, with the forearm, metacarpal and the beginning of the large finger clearly visible, the second wing and beak are in poorer condition, and the legs and body bones have lost their characters.
