= Kalajdžić =

Kalajdžić (Serbian Cyrillic: Калајџић) is a Serbo-Croatian surname, derived from the occupation kalajdžija (tinker). Notable people with the surname include:

- Avdo Kalajdžić (born 1959), former Bosnian professional footballer
- Muhamed Bekir Kalajdžić (1892–1963), Bosnian writer, bookseller and publisher
- Radivoje Kalajdzic (born 1991), Bosnian-American professional boxer
- Sasa Kalajdzic (born 1997), Austrian professional footballer
- Željko Kalajdžić (born 1978), Serbian professional football coach and former player
