= Biser (magazine) =

- Editor: Musa Ćazim Ćatić
- Founder: Muhamed Bekir Kalajdžić
- Founded: 1 June 1912
- Final issue: 1919
- Country: Bosnia and Herzegovina
- Based in: Mostar
- Language: Bosnian

Biser was a Bosnian magazine, intended as a non-political replacement for the defunct Behar. The first issue was published 1 June 1912 out of Mostar, Bosnia and Herzegovina by 19-year-old publisher Muhamed Bekir Kalajdžić. The main objective of Biser was to focus on Bosniak culture and heritage, as well as Muslim literary works. The Bosnian word biser means pearl in English.

Poet Musa Ćazim Ćatić served as editor in chief, often writing poems, essays, criticism, and translations of numerous studies and books for the magazine.

Due to the outbreak of World War I in 1914, Biser halted production until 1918 when Kalajdžić began printing again in 1918 to avoid being drafted into the army. Biser ended its run in 1919.
