= Black Wallachia =

Black Wallachia, Black Vlachia or Black Wallachians may refer to:

- Wallachia
- Moldavia
- Morlachia
