= Zeleno busenje =

1898 Bosnian novel

- Author: Edhem Mulabdić
- Original title: Zeleno busenje
- Language: Bosnian
- Genre: Historical novel
- Published: 1898
- Publication place: Bosnia and Herzegovina
- Media type: Print

Zeleno busenje (Green Turf) is a novel by Edhem Mulabdić, first published in 1898. It is widely regarded as the first Bosniak novel and occupies a central place in the literary canon of modern Bosnian literature.

== Background ==
The novel was written by Edhem Mulabdić (25 December 1862 – 29 January 1954), a Bosniak writer born in Maglaj. Mulabdić belonged to a generation of prominent Bosnian authors at the turn of the 19th and 20th centuries who grappled with adapting to the new Western European lifestyle brought about by the Austro-Hungarian occupation of Bosnia and Herzegovina.

== Plot ==
Set in Maglaj during the Austro-Hungarian occupation of Bosnia, the novel follows the family of the respected Omer-efendija and his three sons: Mehmed, Ahmet, and Alija. The central narrative concerns Ahmet, who leaves behind his mother and his beloved Aiša to fight in defence of his homeland. The novel portrays the collision between patriarchal Ottoman-era Bosnian society and the encroaching forces of Western modernity, tracing how this upheaval shapes the fates of ordinary families. The title derives from the novel's closing image, in which the graves of those lost to the wars and dislocations of the era are covered by green turf.

== Significance ==
Zeleno busenje holds a special place in the history of Bosnian literature of the Austro-Hungarian period and has been recognised by numerous scholars as a landmark work. It is significant not only as a literary and historical document but also for the study of the Bosnian language, reflecting the key features of Bosnian literary language of the Austro-Hungarian era. Successive editions of the novel reveal changes in orthography and vocabulary, including the occasional introduction of Croatianisms in place of words of Oriental origin. The novel is part of the required reading curriculum for secondary schools in Bosnia and Herzegovina.

== See also ==
- Edhem Mulabdić
- Bosnian literature
- Austro-Hungarian rule in Bosnia and Herzegovina
