= Morlachia =

Historical region in the Balkans named after the Morlachs

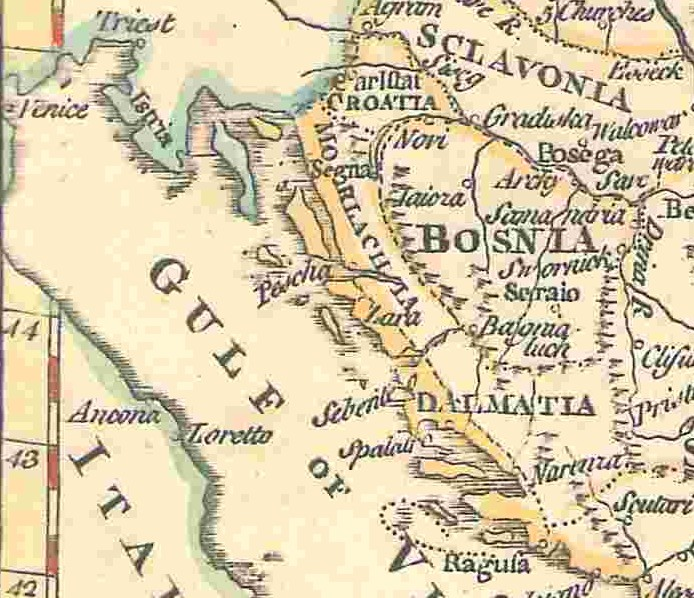
1785 map of Europe showing "Morlachia" in the yellow coast at the right below the blue part of the map. Morlachia is displayed between the regions labelled as "Istria", "Croatia", "Bosnia" and "Dalmatia".

Morlachia (Latin: Morlachia; Italian: Morlacchia; Croatian: Morlakija; Romanian: Morlachia) was a vaguely defined region, named after the Morlachs, used on European maps between the 16th and the 19th centuries. Morlachia was located in modern-day Croatia between Istria and Dalmatia, being opposite the island of Krk. The Morlachs were originally a Romance people related to modern Romanians before their Slavicisation.

== Overview ==
In old topography, the toponym Morlachia was given great importance on maps, sometimes being placed at the same "level" or at a superior one than regions such as Bosnia or Croatia. This can be explained by the important geographical position Morlachia had, being located between the Ottoman Empire, the Republic of Venice and the Habsburg monarchy and its realms from the 16th to the 19th century. However, following the demise of Ottoman power in the region and the fall of the Republic of Venice in the latter century, Morlachia lost relevance and the Morlachs of the region became impoverished and eventually assimilated into the local Slavic populations.

Alberto Fortis's 1774 travel book Viaggio in Dalmazia ("Journey to Dalmatia") described Morlachia and the Morlachs, who as he stated, called themselves "Vlachs". This book achieved great popularity in Western Europe and started a whole literary movement known as Morlachism, based on the depiction of the Morlachs by foreign writers.

Other regions in the area were also known as Morlachia. One example was the Istrian Morlachia (Italian: Morlacchia istriana), a name given to a region of Istria formerly populated by Morlachs during the 16th century as a consequence of a colonization program by the Republic of Venice. Another example is a region around Imotski identified as Morlachia during the 15th century.
