= Karelianism =

19th-century Finnish cultural phenomenon

Karelianism was a late 19th-century cultural phenomenon in the Grand Duchy of Finland and involved writers, painters, poets and sculptors. Since the publishing of the Finnish national epic Kalevala in 1835, compiled from Finnish and Karelian folk lore, culture spheres in Finland became increasingly curious about Karelian heritage and landscape. By the end of the 19th century Karelianism had become a major trend for many works of art and literature in Finland. In the movement Karelia was seen as a sort of refuge for the essence of "Finnishness" that had maintained its authenticity across centuries. The phenomenon can be interpreted as a Finnish version of European national romanticism.

The painters Akseli Gallen-Kallela and Louis Sparre are usually mentioned as the founders of the movement. They were soon joined by the sculptor Emil Wikström, the writers Juhani Aho, Eino Leino and Ilmari Kianto, the composers Jean Sibelius and P.J. Hannikainen, the architects Yrjö Blomstedt and Victor Sucksdorff, and many others.

Later, towards the Second World War, some of the ideas of Karelianism were taken over by an irredentist movement aspiring to create a larger Finland. Thus some of the ideas put forward by Karelianism were used as a motivation for the proposal of a Greater Finland, a single state encompassing many Baltic Finns.

== See also ==
- Heimosodat
- Morlachism
- Romantic nationalism
