= Husein Dubravić =

Husein Đogo Dubravić
- Born: Husejn Gluščević; 3 May 1880; Mostar, Bosnia Vilayet, Ottoman Empire
- Died: 11 September 1961 (aged 81); Gradačac, SR Bosnia and Herzegovina, Yugoslavia

Husein Đogo Dubravić (3 May 1880 – 11 September 1961) was a Bosnian comedic writer, historian, teacher, and publisher. He wrote about the history of Persian literature and general history of the Middle Ages.

Dubravić revived the Bosnian political magazine Behar in 1927, under the new name Novi Behar. The magazine was in print for nearly 20 years, with Dubravić serving as editor.

== Early life ==
Dubravić was born as Husejn Glušćević in Mostar, Bosnia and Herzegovina. Sources give both 1 May and 3 May 1880 as his birthday. Dubravić was raised on Đogo Street, in Mostar's old town Predhum. The street where he grew up was later renamed after Mostar-based poet Aleksa Šantić.

His family name was actually Glušćević, although they had been nicknamed Đogo. Husein officially changed his surname to Dubravić in 1933. Husejn was named after an uncle who died fighting in the 19th-century army of Omar Pasha.

He was one of seven children—four sons and three daughters—born to Alija Gluščević (died 1900) and Abida (née Smajić). His six siblings died of measles before reaching adulthood. As a child Dubravić also had measles and barely survived a bout with scarlet fever.

== Education and personal life ==
Dubravić attended Islamic school maktab and gymnasium in Mostar. One of his classmates was Husaga Ćišić, the future mayor of Mostar. He moved to Sarajevo in 1900 to continue his education with hopes of becoming a teacher. Edhem Mulabdić was among his teachers in Sarajevo.

Following his graduation in 1904, Dubravić worked as a high school teacher in several Bosnian towns before retiring in 1942 and moving to Zagreb, Croatia. He lived in Zagreb for the rest of his life, dying suddenly while traveling through Gradačac in 1961.

== Novi Behar ==
Dubravić and Hamdija Kreševljaković revived the defunct Bosnian political magazine Behar under the name Novi Behar.

The revival was printed in the period from May 1927 to April 1945. The magazine included literature, history, and Islamic teachings, among other topics. Dubravić and Ali Nametak served as editors. The first issue of the newspaper was printed also on 1 May 1927. It was published continuously until 1943 when printing slowed down due to World War II. Six more issues were printed before officially ending in 1945. Novi Behar played an important role in the educational and cultural life of the Muslims of Bosnia and Herzegovina.
