= Bahrija Nuri Hadžić =

Bosnian opera singer (1904–1993)

- Born: 4 March 1904; Sarajevo, Condominium of Bosnia and Herzegovina, Austria-Hungary
- Died: 24 October 1993 (aged 89); Belgrade, FR Yugoslavia
- Occupation: Opera soprano
- Father: Osman Nuri Hadžić

Bahrija Nuri Hadžić (4 March 1904 – 24 October 1993) was a Bosnian soprano and prima donna who was one of the first Yugoslav Muslim opera singers. She is best known for playing the titular roles in Richard Strauss's Salome and Alban Berg's Lulu. During her career, she was known in the press as "The Belgrade Great." Nuri Hadžić also received the Yugoslav lifetime achievement award 'Sedmojulska nagrada' in 1988 for her contributions to art music, and was featured on a Bosnian stamp in 1996.

== Early life and education ==
Bahrija Nuri Hadžić was born on 4 March 1904 in Sarajevo into a wealthy intellectual Bosnian Muslim family. She was one of four daughters of the writer Osman Nuri Hadžić and Almasa (née Sokolović). Nuri Hadžić attended a school run by nuns and received piano lessons at František Matějovský's private music school in Sarajevo, before transferring to a music school in Belgrade after her family moved there in 1921. While studying there, her singing teacher Ivanka Milojević noticed her vocal talent and encouraged her to pursue it further in Vienna. Nuri Hadžić followed her advice and started attending the Vienna Academy of Music, where T. Lierhammer was her tutor. She graduated from there in 1928.

== Career ==
After she graduated from the Academy of Music, she was employed as a soloist at the Bern Theatre, where she performed 23 premières and reprises over three years. It was in Bern that she first performed the title role in Salome by Richard Strauss. In 1931, she joined the Belgrade Opera upon the recommendation of composer Stevan Hristić. For her debut in Belgrade, she again portrayed Salome. Despite heavy criticism from conservatives, including the Serbian Orthodox Church for the character's hedonism, her performance proved extremely popular with audiences. Nuri Hadžić soon became known as The Belgrade Great (Eine Grösse aus Belgrad) in the German press.

Nuri Hadžić is regarded as one of the first Yugoslav Muslim opera singers to find fame in Europe, and as a result received widespread coverage in the Muslim press, with the Gajret journal calling her the "first recognised [Muslim] woman pioneer". The politician Mustafa Mulalić also promoted her as an example that Muslims could contribute to the wider culture while still maintaining their faith. To further demonstrate this, he compiled a series of photographs of Nuri Hadžić wearing a dimija, a traditional headscarf, and in character as Salome.

On 2 June 1937 in Zurich, she originated the title role in the unfinished Alban Berg opera Lulu, which became one of her best known roles. To celebrate his 75th birthday in 1939, composer Richard Strauss conducted a performance of Salome in Zurich with Nuri Hadžić in the title role. He later said that her portrayal of the character was the "Salome whom I have waited for thirty-five years".

Another of her popular roles was the title role in Janáček's Jenůfa, which she performed in Prague on fourteen different occasions. Her other roles include Charlotte in Massenet's Werther, Leonora in Verdi's Il trovatore, Musette in Puccini's La bohème and the title roles in Verdi's Aida, Petar Konjović's Koštana and Massenet's Manon.

In March 1941, she accepted an invitation to perform at a small hall in Mostar as part of a program hosted by the Muslim People's Library. Her appearance there was acclaimed by the crowd and received a standing ovation.

Her career halted in 1943 after she married and retired from the stage. However, she returned to singing over a decade later in the early 1950s at the Belgrade Opera. Although, according to Miljenko Jergović, her roles after her return to the stage "were not roles suited to the quality and needs of her voice".

== Later life and death ==
In 1988, in recognition of her contributions to art music, she was awarded the Yugoslavian lifetime honour 'Sedmojulska nagrada'.

Nuri Hadžić died in Belgrade on 24 October 1993, at the age of 89.

In 1996, she was featured on a Bosnian stamp as part of a Famous Women collection.
