= Ademaga Mešić =

Croatian politician

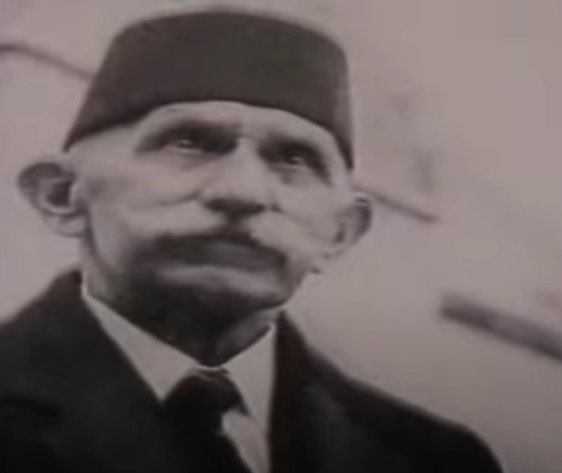
- Ademaga Mešić while listening to Ante Pavelić
- Born: 25 March 1868; Tešanj, Bosnia Vilayet, Ottoman Empire
- Died: 5 July 1945 (aged 77); Zagreb, FS Croatia, Yugoslavia
- Other names: Adem Agha Mešić
- Occupations: merchant, landowner, politician and military officer

Ademaga Mešić or Adem Aga Mešić (25 March 1868 – 5 July 1945) was a Bosnian politician and military officer who served in the Austro-Hungarian Schutzkorps, and later a member of the Ustaše government of the Independent State of Croatia for Bosnian region during World War II.

== Ottoman Bosnia ==
Mešić was married without children, and considered himself a Muslim Croat. He was the publisher of Behar, a Bosnian Muslim political journal published in the period 1900–11.

== Austrian annexation of Bosnia and Herzegovina ==
Mešić belonged to a Croatian-Muslim bloc installed in 1908 by the government of Austria-Hungary to support its annexation of Bosnia and Herzegovina. As a Germanophile, he was a leader of the Muslim supporters of the annexation of Bosnia and Herzegovina who renounced any kind of autonomy, including one based on religion. In 1908, he established the Muslim Progressive Party, which had a pro-Croat orientation. He wrote and published a work titled "Moj odgovor bezimenim klevetnicima".

== First World War ==
At the beginning of World War I he was military commander in the Schutzkorps, an auxiliary volunteer militia established in Bosnia and Herzegovina by the Austro-Hungarian authorities. The unit he organized and commanded was also known as "Ademaga's Army" (Croatian: Ademagina vojska). After the war Mešić was a poultry trader in Tešanj.

== Second World War ==
During World War II, he belonged to a narrow circle of Muslims who were supporters of the Independent State of Croatia and was vice-president of its government (Croatian: Doglavnik) with his seat in Banja Luka. At the end of the war he was part of the Independent State of Croatia evacuation to Austria, only to be imprisoned by British forces, who extradited him to the new Yugoslav communist government.

== Trial and death ==
After the war he was tried. In his closing statement he said that he was only a loyal citizen of the Ottoman sultan, Austrian emperor and Yugoslav king Karađorđević in turn, emphasizing his willingness to continue his loyal service, now to the new communist government. Mešić was sentenced to life in prison, where he died in 1945.
