= Schutzkorps =

- Active: 1908–1909; 1914–1918
- Country: Austria-Hungary
- Branch: Austro-Hungarian Army
- Type: Auxiliary volunteer militia
- Role: Anti-guerilla warfare
- Size: 20,000 (peak strength)

The Schutzkorps (Serbo-Croatian: Šuckor; lit. "Protection Corps") was an auxiliary volunteer militia established by Austro-Hungarian authorities in the newly annexed province of Bosnia and Herzegovina to track down Bosnian Serb opposition (members of the Chetniks and the Komiti), while its main victims were civilians. Officially, they were an auxiliary gendarmerie, while in reality, they conducted illegal and repressive activities. It predominantly drew recruits from members of the Bosniak population and it became infamous as a result of its heavy involvement in the persecution of the Serbs. They particularly targeted Serb populated areas of eastern Bosnia.

The role of the Schutzkorps is a point of debate. Persecution of Serbs conducted by the Austro-Hungarian authorities was the "first incidence of active 'ethnic cleansing' in Bosnia and Herzegovina". Some Muslim leaders emphasized that it would be wrong to blame the whole Muslim population of Bosnia and Herzegovina for the misdeeds of the Schutzkorps, because some Muslims provided help to their Serb neighbors, while some Serbs hid from persecution by applying to the Schutzkorps.

== History ==
The Annexation crisis of 1908–09 erupted on 6 October 1908, when Austria-Hungary announced the annexation of Bosnia and Herzegovina. Many people of Bosnia and Herzegovina were dissatisfied with the events, particularly Serbs who remained in feudal obligations to their Muslim landlords. To prevent their uprising, Austria-Hungary undertook repressive measures against Serb population, conducted by Schutzkorps. Schutzkorps were organized in eleven battalions of volunteers. In Herzegovina, the Schutzkorps avoided taking overly harsh measures against Serb populations near the border of Montenegro to avoid provoking its reaction. Since Gacko and Nevesinje are not near the border, its Serb population was subjected to terror from the Schutzkorps. At the end of October 1908, Serbs of Gacko reported to the government in Sarajevo about the Schutzkorps' terror, but no action was taken to investigate their reports.

After the outbreak of the First Balkan War in 1912, anti-Serb sentiment increased in the Austro-Hungarian administration in Bosnia and Herzegovina. Oskar Potiorek, governor of Bosnia and Herzegovina, closed many Serb societies and significantly contributed to the anti-Serb mood before the outbreak of World War I. The Government's plans to mobilize Croats and Muslims into Schutzkorps units in case of the war against Serbia were revealed in December 1912 in Banja Luka and caused protests among its Serb population. The idea to revive volunteer units was not implemented.

The Schutzkorps was re-established on Potiorek's orders following the assassination. The leaders of the Frankists in Zagreb played an important role in its establishment. The Austro-Hungarians granted the Schutzkorps "full powers to deal with the Serbian population." Its members were primarily Bosnian Muslims. Bosnia and Herzegovina's Muslim inhabitants, with the exception of those who identified as Serbs, were generally pro-Habsburg. The Austro-Hungarians rarely questioned their loyalty. Croats also served within the ranks of the Schutzkorps, as did some Serbs. The militia's Serb members were motivated to join it because it precluded them from being sent to the frontlines. The decision to recruit primarily amongst Bosnian Muslims and Croats was part of deliberate divide-and-rule strategy employed by the Austro-Hungarians, the historian Aviel Roshwald writes. Initially, the militia consisted of around 11,000 men and 1,600 veterans. It increased in size over the course of the war, eventually numbering 20,000 members. The Austro-Hungarian authorities believed that the Serbs of Herzegovina were the most likely to launch an anti-Habsburg rebellion. Thus, about 5,000 members of the Schutzkorps, or about 45 percent of its initial manpower, were stationed in the region. Three-thousand of these were stationed in eastern Herzegovina.

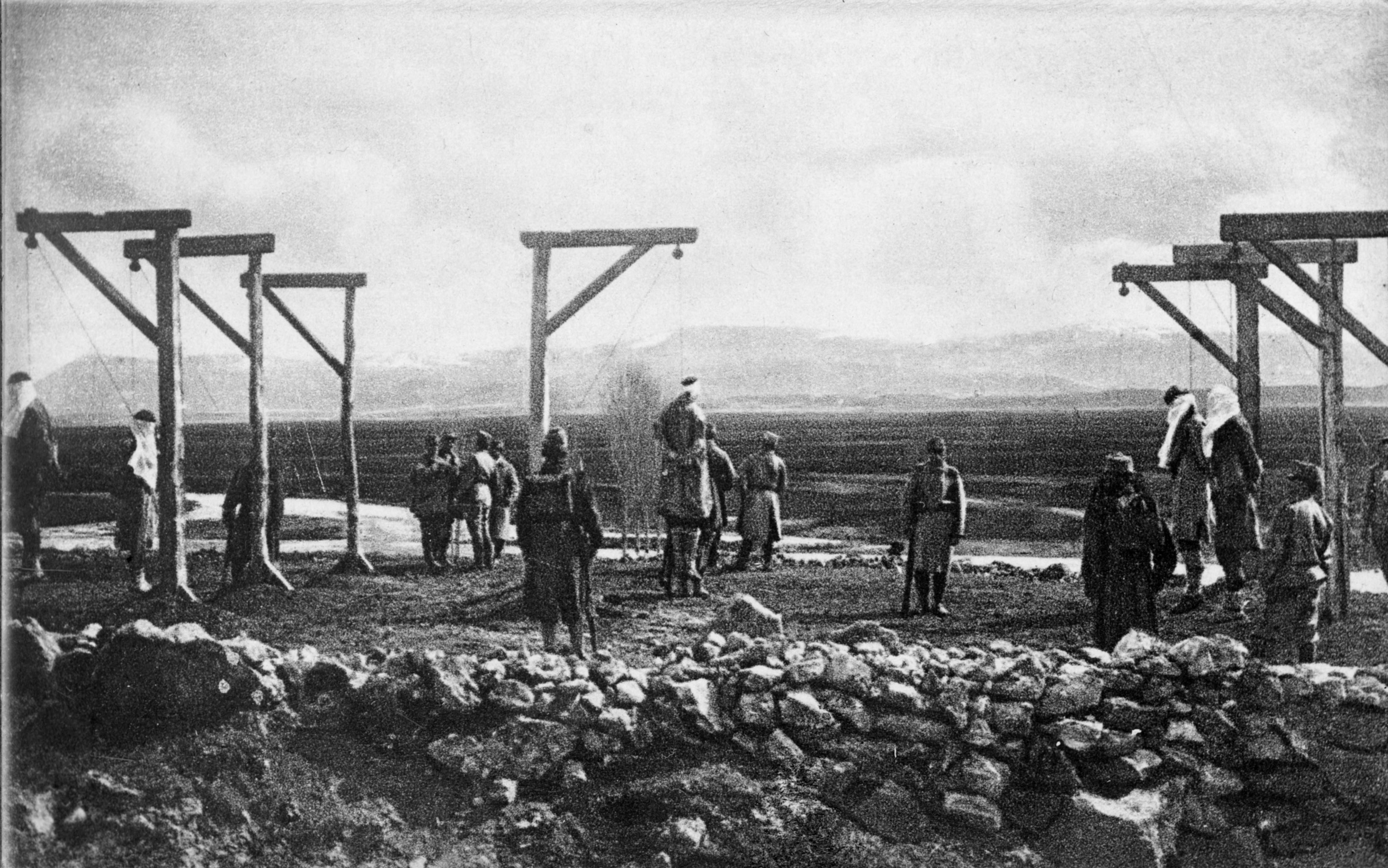

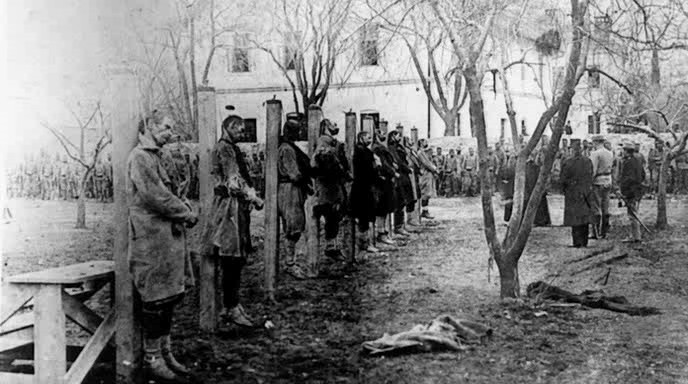
Hangings of Serbs in Trebinje, Herzegovina, by Austro-Hungarian authorities.

Following Austria-Hungary's declaration of war against Serbia on 28 July 1914, the Schutzkorps began conducting mass executions of Serb civilians in Herzegovina, notably hanging 79 of Trebinje's most prominent Serb citizens, among them intellectuals, landowners, and members of the clergy. Killings continued throughout Herzegovina, accompanied by the taking of hostages, looting, and the destruction of property. Executions were often arbitrary and the majority of victims were denied the right to legal recourse. Along the Drina River, near the border with Serbia, the Schutzkorps were tasked with "anti-bandit operations", culminating in a massacre of Serb civilians near Foča.

Imprisonment of around 5,500 (700 to 2,200 of them died in prison) and execution of 460 citizens of Serb ethnicity in Bosnia and Herzegovina at the beginning of the World War I heavily relied on Schutzkorps. Around 5,200 Serb families were forcibly expelled from Bosnia and Herzegovina. The Schutzkorps shouted anti-Serb slogans and songs, such as "There is no three-fingered cross", while committing their crimes.

Members of the Schutzkorps were not issued Austro-Hungarian military uniforms. Instead, they wore black-yellow armbands to distinguish themselves from Serbian irregulars, who also did not wear uniforms. The Schutzkorps members' dressing in civilian garb and use of Serbo-Croatian to shout orders resulted in several friendly-fire incidents between them and the Austro-Hungarian Army. It was subsequently ordered that basic commands had to be shouted in German.

== Legacy ==
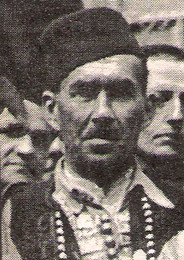
Ademaga Mešić

This was the first persecution of substantial number of citizens of Bosnia and Herzegovina because of their ethnicity. At the same time, the Serb casualties in Eastern Bosnia were partially the result of activities undertaken in retaliation to Serbian Chetniks who in fall 1914 had carried out attacks against Bosniaks in the area.

Suljaga Salihagić, a Bosnian Muslim, emphasized that not all Muslims were responsible for the activities of Schutzkorps because many provided help to their Serb fellow citizens. Some Muslim leaders denied that Schutzkorps were strictly Muslim and Croat units because many Serbs hid in these units, some even commanded by men of Serb ethnicity. One of the commanders of the Schutzkorps in the Tešanj region was Ademaga Mešić, who went on to fight alongside the Ustaše during World War II.

In 1929, a priest from Trebinje published a book, documenting the acts of persecution, murders, and destruction of houses committed by the Schutzkorps in Trebinje and several other villages of the region. The formation of a local Schutzkorps unit in Višegrad, by Muslims, is described in Ivo Andrić's 1945 novel The Bridge on the Drina.
