= Venetian literature =

Venetian literature is the corpus of literature in Venetian, the vernacular language of the region roughly corresponding to Venice, from the 12th century. Venetian literature, after an initial period of splendour in the sixteenth century with the success of artists such as Ruzante, reached its zenith in the eighteenth century, thanks to its greatest exponent, dramatist Carlo Goldoni. Subsequently, the literary production in Venetian underwent a period of decline following the collapse of the Republic of Venice, but survived nonetheless into the twentieth century to reach peaks with wonderful lyrical poets such as Biagio Marin of Grado.

== Origin ==
The first evidence of the birth of vernacular Venetian (and Italian) is the Veronese Riddle, dating between the end of the eighth and the early ninth century, written in a language halfway between Latin and the vernacular.

The first fragment entirely in Venetian, dating to circa 1198, is the Ritmo bellunese which deals with events at Belluno in the years 1183 to 1196.

== Thirteenth century ==
In the thirteenth century, there is an explosion of compositions in the Venetian language designed to meet the literary tastes of the emerging urban classes. Especially remarkable is the production of the Veronese School, with Giacomino da Verona, author of the poem in two parts, De Gerusalem Celesti ("On the Heavenly Jerusalem") and De Babilonia Civitate Infernali ("On Babylon, the Infernal City"). Published anonymously from this era are Lamento della Sposa Padovana or Bona çilosia

== Fourteenth century ==
Throughout the 14th century, the centre of literary production Venetian continued to be Padua. At the end of the 14th century, the Carraresi commissioned Bibbia istoriata padovana and Liber agregà of Serapion also called "Erbario Carrarese" (held at the British Library, London), a translation from the Latin Carrara Herbarium, a treatise of medicine originally in Arabic. An important writer from this period is Francesco di Vannozzo (~1330-1389).

Between 1313 and 1315, Paolino Veneto wrote Trattato de regimine rectoris, a mirror for princes dedicated to the Venetian duke of Candia.

Cronaca de la guera tra Veniciani e Zenovesi by Daniele da Chinazzo is a chronicle of the War of Chioggia between 1379 and 1381.

Original works of the fourteenth century include those that go together under the name of Franco-Venetian literature characterized by a unique mix of vulgar Venetian with medieval French. Among the best known works are the anonymously authored Entrée d'Espagne and its continuation, La prise de Pampelune by Niccolò da Verona.

== Later ==
Notable is a manuscript titled "Dialogue ... on the New star" attributed to Galileo (1564–1642).

The language enjoyed substantial prestige in the days of the Venetian Republic, when it attained the status of a lingua franca in the Mediterranean. Notable Venetian-language authors are the playwrights Ruzante (1502–1542) and Carlo Goldoni (1707–1793). Both Ruzante and Goldoni, following the old Italian theater tradition (Commedia dell'Arte), used Venetian in their comedies as the speech of the common folk. They are ranked among the foremost Italian theatrical authors of all time, and Goldoni's plays are still performed today. There also were some Morlachist Venetian authors. Other notable works in Venetian are the translations of the Iliad by Casanova (1725–1798) and Francesco Boaretti, and the poems of Biagio Marin (1891–1985).

Nowadays Venetian is still vigorous even in Brazil, where it is called Talian. This Venetian language version, spoken by hundreds of thousands of emigrants from Veneto living in Brazil, is written by dozens of writers, especially in Rio Grande do Sul and Santa Catarina.
