= Bošnjak (newspaper) =

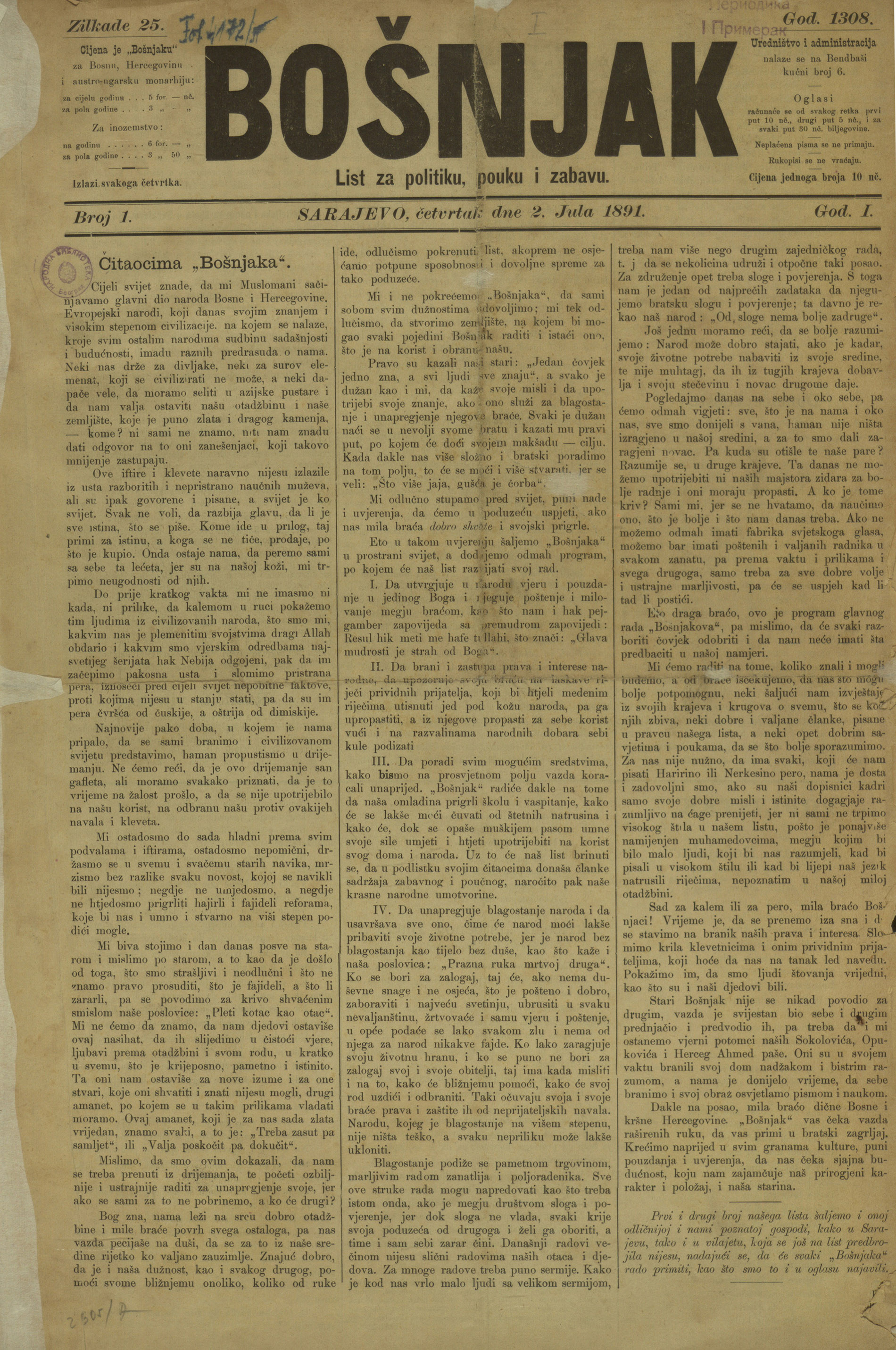
- Founder: Mehmed-beg Kapetanović Ljubušak
- Founded: 2 July 1891
- Language: Bosnian

Bošnjak was a Bosnian newspaper. In early April 1891, the Bosnian government gave support to a request by a group of Bosniaks led by Mehmed-beg Kapetanović Ljubušak, then Mayor of Sarajevo, for the publication of this political paper. The first issue of Bošnjak was published on 2 July 1891. The owner until issue number 17 was Mehmed-beg Kapetanović Ljubušak, and the editor was Hilmo Muhibić. One of the later editors was Edhem Mulabdić, as well as Šukri Karišiković and Muhamed Senai Softić. The newspaper was printed in Latin script in the Bosnian language.
