= Ritmo bellunese =

Venetian poem from c. 1198 CE

The Ritmo bellunese or Cantilena bellunese is a brief vernacular Venetian passage in an anonymous fragment of a medieval Latin chronicle of events in the history of Belluno between 1183 and 1196. From circa 1198, it is the earliest securely datable text in a Venetian vernacular. It is preserved in manuscript in the Catalogo de Vescovi (bishops' catalogue) of the Museo Civico (city museum) in Belluno.

The Ritmo consists in a single hendecasyllabic quatrain surrounded by prose. The German historian Phillipp August Becker argued that it was not in fact verse, and Carlo Salvioni believed it was composed of alexandrines. It is not strictly syllabic, but the rhyme scheme is clear. It forms part of the narration of the war Belluno and its ally Feltre waged against Treviso, in which they acquired territory in the proximity of the latter (1193). There is no transition between prose and verse, nor between Latin and vernacular. The four lines describe the destruction of Casteldardo, a Trevisan outpost near Trichiana, which was dismantled and its parts thrown into the river Ardo. The capture of six Trevisan knights is also boasted:

De Castel d'Ard havi li nostri bona part:
i lo zetta tutto intro lo flumo d'Ard:
e sex cavaler de Tarvis li plui fer
con sé duse li nostri cavaler.

Translation:

Of Castel d'Ardo got ours a good part:
they threw it all into the river Ardo:
and six knights of Treviso the strongest
alongside themselves escorted our knights.

— Translated from Italian translation at Wikisource.

Linguistically, the text is in a form of Venetian (in which it is called the Ritmo Belumat or Belunéxe), as indicated by the conjugation of the third person masculine with the clitic i (as in i lo zetta, which in modern Venetian would be i lo ga getà or i l'à getà) and the northern tendency to lose final vowels (as in Ard, part, cavaler). The preterite tense, now disappeared in Venetian, but not in Italian, is used (as in getà, duse).

== Editions ==
- In Rime giullaresche e popolari d'Italia. Vincenzo de Bartholomaeis, ed. Bologna: Zanichelli, 1926.
- In Carlo Salvioni. "Ancora del Cavassico: la cantilena bellunese del 1193". Nozze Cian=Sappa-Flandinet. Bergamo: 1894.
