= Viaggio in Dalmazia =

1774 Venetian travel book about Dalmatia

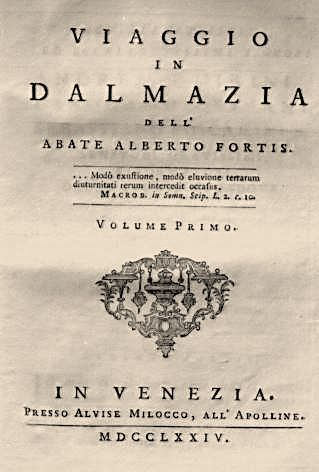
- Title page of Viaggio in Dalmazia
- Author: Alberto Fortis
- Original title: Viaggio in Dalmazia dell'abate Alberto Fortis
- Language: Italian
- Genre: Travel literature
- Publication date: 1774
- Publication place: Republic of Venice

Viaggio in Dalmazia ('Journey to Dalmatia'), also known by its full title Viaggio in Dalmazia dell'abate Alberto Fortis ('Journey to Dalmatia by Abbot Alberto Fortis'), is a 1774 book by the Venetian writer Alberto Fortis, published in the city of Venice. In the book, Fortis recounted his journey to the region of Dalmatia, then under Venetian rule and today in Croatia. He described the region, its mineral resources and its inhabitants and their way of life, paying great attention to the native Morlachs. Their customs and traditions were also described, including vampire folklore.

Fortis' book reached great popularity in Western Europe and increased the interest on Croatia and other South Slavic countries among ethnologists and anthropologists. Furthermore, Viaggio in Dalmazia would start a new movement in Italian, Ragusan and Venetian literature known as Morlachism, which consisted of the portrayal of the Morlachs and their customs, traditions and lifestyle by Italian and other Western European writers. This movement started in 1774 and lasted until the 1830s or 1840s.

In 1776, the Croatian writer Ivan Lovrić, a native of Dalmatia, published Osservazioni di Giovanni Lovrich sopra diversi pezzi del viaggio in Dalmazia del signor abbot Alberto Fortis coll'aggiunta della vita di Soçivizça ('Observations of Giovanni Lovrich [Ivan Lovrić] on several pieces of the journey to Dalmatia of Mr. Abbot Alberto Fortis with the addition of the life of Soçivizça'), in Venice as well, as a response to Fortis' book. Lovrić criticized Fortis' writings and tried to rectify some of his accounts about the people of Dalmatia on it. Furthermore, instead of including folk poems as Fortis had done, Lovrić included in his book the biography of the Serbian hajduk (brigand) Stanislav Sočivica (Soçivizça in Lovrić's Italian). Lovrić's book also met criticism from other authors, some of whom may have been Fortis under a pseudonym.
