= Biser (given name) =

Biser (Bulgarian: Бисер) is a Bulgarian given name. Notable people with the name include:

- Biser Ivanov (born 1973), Bulgarian footballer and coach
- Biser Kirov (1942–2016), Bulgarian pop singer
- Biser Mihaylov (1943–2020), Bulgarian footballer
