= Osman Nuri Hadžić =

Bosnian intellectual and writer

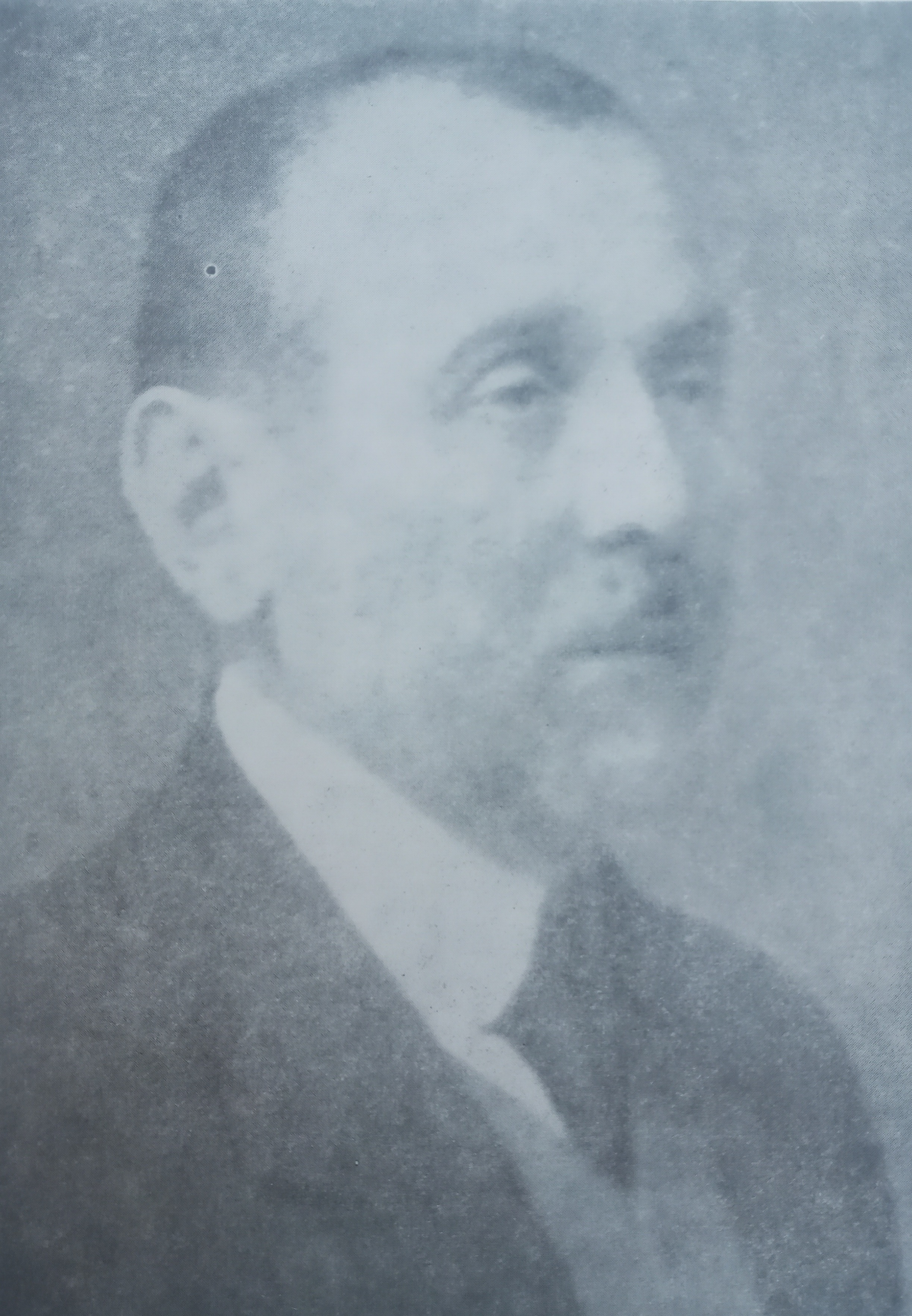
- Osman Nuri Hadžić
- Born: 28 June 1869; Mostar, Bosnia Eyalet, Ottoman Empire
- Died: 23 December 1937 (aged 68); Belgrade, Kingdom of Yugoslavia
- Education: Sharia law school in Sarajevo, University of Vienna
- Spouse: Bahrija Vajzović
- Children: 4, including Bahrija
- Writing career
- Pen name: Aziz Osman
- Language: Bosnian

Osman Nuri Hadžić (28 June 1869 – 23 December 1937) was a Bosnian Muslim intellectual and writer who is known for co-founding the political journal Behar in 1900. He is also known for his book "Muhammed and the Quran: A Cultural History of Islam," which is regarded as one of the most extensive works in the Bosnian language on the history and culture of Islam. Nuri Hadžić also served as Director of the School of Sharia Judges.

== Early life and education ==
Osman Nuri Hadžić was born on 28 June 1869 in Mostar. He was educated there before attending the Sarajevo School for Sharia Judges. Afterwards, he moved to Zagreb to study law at the University of Zagreb. He also studied in Vienna.

== Career ==
While he was still at university in 1894, he wrote Islam i kultura (Islam in Culture) treatise as a response to the anti-Muslim Letopis Matice Srpske pamphlet by Milan Nedeljković. In it, Nuri Hadžić argues that Muslims have contributed to human culture and learning throughout history, including with scientific development. He also claims that Muslim women have more rights than their Western counterparts because Islamic law grants them control over their inheritance. In his response, Nuri Hadžić also strongly argued that it was a religious duty for Muslims, regardless of sex, to educate themselves. The treatise also includes Nuri Hadžić's history of Islam across the centuries.

After finishing his education, he returned to Bosnia to work as an official at the Sarajevo district court. Nuri Hadžić then worked for the Provincial Government before becoming Director of the School of Sharia Judges.

In 1897, he and Ivan Miličević collaborated on the novel Bez svrhe (Without Purpose), which critiques madrassa education.

On 1 May 1900, he co-launched the political journal Behar with Safvet beg Bašagić and Edhem Mulabdić. They aimed to promote Islamic education and wider cultural learning to Bosniaks. Nuri Hadžić himself wanted it to promote the conservation of religious educational institutes and Islamic reformist issues. Six years after its founding, Nuri Hadžić resigned from the journal following the return of fellow co-founder Bašagić, who had boycotted it for two years..

In 1903, he released Islam i prosvjeta (Islam and Education) for the Gajret magazine. Nuri Hadžić writes for the magazine again in 1925, where he revisits the issue of women's rights in Islam with a series of articles named "The Woman Question in Islam". In it, he argues that segregation and veiling were popular before Islam came to the Arabian Peninsula and that its spread allowed women are afforded more rights than they had previously. However, he did state that he believed some Muslim women were still being denied rights afforded to them from the Quran.

Nuri Hadžić expands on his Islam in Culture with the book Muhammed i Koran – kulturna istorija islama (Muhammed and the Quran: A Cultural History of Islam) published in the 1930s. The book is regarded as one of the most comprehensive works on the culture and history in the Bosnian language.

== Political views ==
Hadžić was a Croatophile and considered himself to be Croatian. When Austria-Hungary gained control of Bosnia and Herzegovina, Hadžić believed it presented an opportunity for Muslims to benefit from the European educational system. Although this view contrasted with many ordinary Bosnian and Herzegovinian Muslims.

== Personal life and death ==
Nuri Hadžić had four daughters with Bahrija Vajzović. Their children were raised with a strong emphasis on education, and all four attended university. One of their daughters, Bahrija (1904–1993), is regarded as one of the first Yugoslav Muslim opera singers.

On 22 December 1937, Nuri Hadžić died in Belgrade, at the age of 68.

== Works ==
- Muhammed i Koran – kulturna istorija islama ("Muhammed and the Quran: A Cultural History of Islam"; 1931)

== Sources ==
- Giomi, Fabio (2021). Making Muslim Women European – Voluntary Associations, Gender, and Islam in Post-Ottoman Bosnia and Yugoslavia (1878–1941). Central European University Press. ISBN 9789633863695 – via Internet Archive.
- Okey, Robin (27 September 2007). Taming Balkan Nationalism The Habsburg 'Civilizing Mission' in Bosnia 1878-1914. Oxford University Press. ISBN 9780199213917.
- Karčić, Fikret (1999). The Bosniaks and the challenges of modernity: late Ottoman and Hapsburg times. El Kalem. ISBN 9958230216.
