= Aleksandra Nikolić =

Serbian model

- Occupation: Fashion model

Aleksandra Nikolić (Serbian Cyrillic: Александра Николић; born 1990) is a Serbian fashion model. She is known for appearing in a Pitbull music video and being profiled in a 2017 issue of GQ magazine.

== Career ==
Nikolić started out modeling in Serbia in 2010, appearing in TV commercials and a music video for local pop singer Arindy. She also modeled for various Serbian fashion magazines like "Harpers Bazaar", "Grazia", "Joy Serbia", and "Svet & Style". Additionally, she appeared on the cover of Spanish "Harpers Bazaar" and in the French magazines "Femme" and "Noon". She was also photographed in a spread for "The New Yorker" in 2014. She has been seen in ad campaigns for "Jacobs by Marc Jacobs" and Swedish brand "Chiquelle". In 2016, she did a runway show in Miami for the Serbian label "Hamel", designed by Melina Džinović. Nikolić also modeled in Japan for six months.

== Personal life ==
Nikolić was born and raised in Belgrade. She has lived in Miami since 2013, where she is represented by Elite Models. She also worked for a company in Germany which produces gardening tools.
