= Hasanaginica (film) =

- Directed by: Mića Popović
- Written by: Mića Popović
- Based on: Hasanaginica
- Starring: Milena Dravić; Rade Marković; Relja Bašić; Ratislav Jović
- Edited by: Jelena Bjenjaš
- Music by: Zoran Hristić
- Production company: FRZ Belgrade
- Release date: 1967
- Running time: 72 min
- Country: Yugoslavia
- Language: Serbo-Croatian

Hasanaginica (English: Hassan-Aga's Wife) is a 1967 Yugoslav feature film. It was written and directed by Mića Popović based on the motifs of a folk ballad of the same name from Imotski.

== Plot ==
Zeina is left at home with two children and an elderly servant after her husband, Hasanaga, leaves on military duty. Zeina's brother Murat comes to visit, complaining that the water has washed away his land and asking his sister for money to buy new land from the Kadia of Imot. Zeina is impatiently waiting for Hasanaga. She refuses to go to him when summoned, because of a warning dream. On his return, he throws her out of his house. Zeina is banished and forever separated from her children.

== Cast ==
- Milena Dravić as Zeina (Hasanaginica)
- Rade Marković as Džamonja
- Đorđe Nenadović as Hasanaga
- Relja Bašić as Kadia of Imot
- Rastislav Jović as Murat
- Kaja Grganović
- Bogdan Dević
- Aleksandar Dević
- Prvoslav Nikolić
- Živorad Šobić

== Awards ==
- Pula Film Festival, 1967 - Golden Arena for Best Music
