= Alberto Fortis =

Venetian writer, naturalist and cartographer (1741–1803)

- Engraved portrait of Alberto Fortis by Giuseppe Fusinati
- Born: 11 November 1741; Padua, Republic of Venice
- Died: 21 October 1803 (aged 61); Bologna, Italian Republic
- Resting place: Certosa di Bologna
- Occupations: Writer; Naturalist; Cartographer
- Known for: Viaggio in Dalmazia

Alberto Fortis (Note: Also known as Abbe Alberto Fortis. and also Abate Alberto Fortis. Abate is a Venetian spelling of Abbe (Name Origin Research staff 2011)) FRS (9 or 11 November 1741 – 21 October 1803) was an Italian writer, naturalist and cartographer, citizen of Republic of Venice.

== Life ==
Giovanni Battista Fortis was born in Padua on either 9 or 11 November 1741. After studying theology at the seminary of Padua, he joined the Augustinian Canons with the religious name of Alberto. He spent the early 1760s studying theology in Augustinian convents in Padua, Verona, Bologna and Vicenza. During breaks from his studies, he undertook geological excursions with Giovanni Arduino and conducted zoological and palaeontological research with the Camaldolese naturalist Guido Ignazio Vio. In 1766, Fortis was sent to Rome to study theology, languages and natural sciences in the college of his order.

In May 1770, Fortis travelled to the northern Adriatic islands of Cres and Lošinj (then part of the Republic of Venice) with the British jurist and agricultural expert John Symonds and the Neapolitan physician and botanist Domenico Cirillo. This was the first in a series of journeys funded by prominent English patrons and the Venetian Senate, which would lay the foundations for his lifelong interest in the Slavic world.

Following the dissolution of his order in 1772, Fortis devoted himself entirely to scientific research. When the Chair of Natural History at the University of Padua became vacant following Antonio Vallisneri Jr.'s death in 1777, Fortis aspired to the position. However, he was ultimately denied the appointment due to conservative opposition to his liberal views on the relationship between science and religion. From 1782 to 1787, Fortis co-edited the Giornale Enciclopedico with Elisabetta Caminèr Turra, regularly publishing scientific, naturalistic and literary essays in the periodical.

In 1785, Fortis was appointed as the official mineralogist to the Bourbon Court of Naples under King Ferdinand IV. During his time living and working in Naples, he was tasked with reforming the local saltpeter industry and conducted extensive scientific surveys in the region, including research at the volcanic site of the Pulo di Molfetta. In 1795 he returned to the University of Padua. Following the fall of the Republic of Venice, he relocated to Bologna.

From 1765 onwards, Fortis undertook several research expeditions, visiting Veneto, Istria and Dalmatia, as well as central and southern Italy. He was interested in geological phenomena and archaeological artefacts, as well as the traditional costumes and folklore of the local populations. In the field of geology, he was particularly interested in volcanism and the formation of rocks. He maintained an extensive correspondence with scholars in Italy, Germany, France, England, Switzerland, and Dalmatia. In 1788, he became a member of the Accademia Nazionale delle Scienze and, the following year, he was elected to the Leopoldina. In 1795 Fortis was elected Fellow of the Royal Society in London. He died in Bologna eight years later on 21 October 1803.

== Viaggio in Dalmazia ==
Fortis' best-known work is Viaggio in Dalmazia (Journey to Dalmatia), originally published in 1774 and first published in London in 1778.

The highlight of the book is the description of Morlachia, a historical region currently located in Croatia named after the Morlachs that inhabited the region. In his book, Fortis presented his literary discovery "Hasanaginica" as a Morlach (Vlach) ballad. Larry Wolff believed Fortis wrote the ballad as a poetry of South Slavs rather than a poetry of the Morlachs. Fortis believed that the Morlachs preserved their old customs and clothes. Their ethnographic traits were traditional clothing, use of the gusle musical instrument accompanied with epic singing. He also published several specimens of Morlach songs. Fortis noted that the Slavic-speaking Morlachs called themselves “Vlachs”, but refuted the assumption that they might be related to the Latin-speaking Vlachs.

Alberto Fortis's account of the Morlachs, translated into French, English and German brought the Morlachs to the attention of Europe. This started a new literary movement known as Morlachism.

The Croatian writer Ivan Lovrić, who wrote Osservazioni di Giovanni Lovrich sopra diversi pezzi del viaggio in Dalmazia del signor abate Alberto Fortis coll'aggiunta della vita di Soçivizça ("Observations of Giovanni Lovrich [Ivan Lovrić] on several pieces of the journey to Dalmatia of Mr. Abbot Alberto Fortis with the addition of the life of Soçivizça"), accused Fortis of many factual errors, which he attempted to rectify and showed the similarity between Vlach's language and the Romanian language. Travels into Dalmatia played an important role in bringing the Dalmatian culture to the attention of Europe during the rise of Romantic notions about folklore. Dalmatian hinterlands became epitomized by Hasanaginica, a folk ballad that was first written down by Fortis.

== Works ==
Viaggio in Dalmazia dell'Abate Alberto Fortis ("Journey to Dalmatia by Abbot Alberto Fortis"), 1774

- Saggio d'osservazioni sopra l'isola di Cherso ed Osero. Venice: G. Storti. 1771.
- Viaggio in Dalmazia. Venice: Alvise Milocco. 1774.
- Della coltura del castagno da introdursi nella Dalmazia marittima e mediterranea. Naples: S.L. 1780.
- Lettere geografico-fisiche sopra la Calabria e la Puglia. Naples: Porcelli. 1784.
- Delle ossa d’elefanti e d’altre curiosità naturali de’ monti di Romagnano nel Veronese. Vicenza: Turra. 1786.
- Del nitro minerale. Memoria storico-fisica. Naples. 1787.
- Tre lettere intorno alle produzioni fossili dei monti Euganei. Cesena: Biasini. 1791.
- Tre lettere sopra i pesci fossili di Bolca. Venice: A. Zatta. 1793.
- Della torba che trovasi appié de’ Colli Euganei. Venice: Palese. 1795.
- Memoires pour servir a l'histoire naturelle et principalement a l'oryctographie de l'Italie et des pays adjacens. 2 vols. Paris: Fuchs. 1802.

=== Works in English translation ===
- Fortis, Alberto (1778). Travels into Dalmatia; containing general observations on the natural history of that country and the neighboring islands; the natural productions, arts, manners and customs of the inhabitants: in a series of letters from Abbe Alberto Fortis. London: J. Robson. OCLC 4895425.
- Fortis, Alberto (1786). A poetical sketch of the revolutions that have happened in the natural history of our planet: intended as a specimen of a philosophical and theological poem. London: B. White. OCLC 642418397.

== Bibliography ==
- Addison's Rare Books & Bindery, 1774. Viaggio in Dalmazia. 1st Edition with 15 folding plates. Very Rare, OneRareBook.com
- Ciceran, Marisa (22 September 2011) [2008], Alberto Fortis, Istria on the Internet
- Fortis, Alberto (1778), Travels into Dalmatia; containing general observations on the natural history of that country and the neighboring islands; the natural productions, arts, manners and customs of the inhabitants: in a series of letters from Abbe Alberto Fortis., London: J. Robson, OCLC 4895425
- Fortis, Alberto (1786), A poetical sketch of the revolutions that have happened in the natural history of our planet : intended as a specimen of a philosophical and theological poem, London: B. White, OCLC 642418397
- International Musicological Society Congress (1990), Kongressbericht, vol. 3, Bärenreiter
- International Musicological Society Congress (1993), Actas del XV Congreso de la Sociedad Internacional de Musicología: culturas musicales de Mediterraneo y sus ramificaciónes, Madrid/3-10/IV/1992, La Sociedad
- Maggs, Barbara W. (October 1989), "Three Phases of Primitivism in Portraits of Eighteenth-Century Croatia", Slavonic and East European Review, 67 (4): 546–563
- Name Origin Research staff (2011), Last name: Abate, Internet Surname Database
- Wolff, Larry (2003a), Venice and the Slavs: The Discovery of Dalmatia in the Age of Enlightenment, Stanford University Press, pp. 191–192, ISBN 0-8047-3946-3
- Wolff, Larry (2003b), "Rise and Fall of Morlachismo". In: Norman M. Naimark, Holly Case, Yugoslavia and Its Historians: Understanding the Balkan Wars of the 1990s, Stanford University Press, pp. 40–46, ISBN 978-0804745949
