= Morlachism =

Movement in Italian, Ragusan and Venetian literature from the 18th and 19th centuries

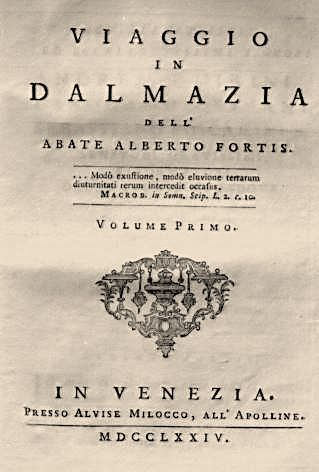
Title page of Viaggio in Dalmazia by Alberto Fortis (1774), work considered to have initiated Morlachism

Morlachism or Morlacchism (Italian: Morlacchismo; Serbo-Croatian: Morlakizam or Morlakizma) was a movement in Italian, Ragusan and Venetian literature that started in 1774 and lasted until the 1830s or 1840s. It consisted on the portrayal of the Morlachs (Vlachs from the Dalmatian Hinterland, now part of Croatia) and other inhabitants of Dalmatia and their beliefs, customs, way of living and many other aspects as understood and imagined by Italians, Ragusans, Venetians and other Europeans. Morlachism was initiated by Alberto Fortis's travel book Viaggio in Dalmazia ("Journey to Dalmatia") from 1774, which achieved great popularity in Western Europe.

In 2014, Branislava Milić Brett, then a professor at the University of Alberta, coined the term "Proto-Morlachism" (also referred to as "Pre-Morlachism") to refer to a purported earlier stage of Morlachism that lasted from the Middle Ages to 1774. According to her, particularities of Proto-Morlachism include that, unlike Morlachism, it also included interventions and viewpoints from the Morlachs themselves. One example of a Proto-Morlachist author would have been the Italian poet Franco Sacchetti.

== See also ==
- Karelianism
