= Behar (magazine) =

Bosniak political magazine published between 1900 and 1911

- Frequency: Biweekly
- Publisher: Ademaga Mešić
- Founder: Edhem Mulabdić, Safvet-beg Bašagić, Osman Nuri Hadžić
- First issue: 1 May 1900
- Final issue: 1911
- Country: Bosnia and Herzegovina
- Based in: Sarajevo
- Language: Bosnian, Croatian

Behar was a Bosniak political magazine published twice monthly between 1900 and 1911. The word behar (blossom in Bosnian) derives from Persian bahār (spring, blossom). It was established in 1900 by Bosniak intellectuals Edhem Mulabdić, Safvet-beg Bašagić, and Osman Nuri Hadžić, assisted financially by Ademaga Mešić.

During the first eight years of existence it was primarily focused on religious and family topics. Magazine published articles on Islamic past and religion, literally works of local authors and translations of Oriental literature. In VII volume it regularly published 4 pages of text in Ottoman Turkish, while from the IX volume it was also marked as a Croatian magazine. The magazine was published in Gaj's Latin alphabet.

In addition to Bašagić and Mulabdić, Musa Ćazim Ćatić, Džemaludin Čaušević, and Ljudevit Dvorniković also served as editors during the decade that the magazine was published.

A 1927 revival, called Novi behar (New Blossom), by Hamdija Kreševljaković and Husein Dubravić lasted until 1943.
