= Musa Ćazim Ćatić =

Bosnian poet (1878–1915)

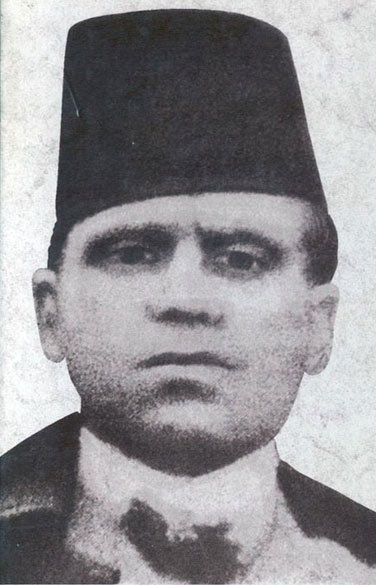
- Born: 12 March 1878; Odžak, Bosnia Vilayet, Ottoman Empire
- Died: 6 April 1915 (aged 37); Tešanj, Bosnia and Herzegovina, Austria-Hungary
- Citizenship: Austria-Hungary
- Education: University of Zagreb
- Occupation: Poet
- Writing career
- Language: Serbo-Croatian
- Period: Realism

Musa Ćazim Ćatić (Serbian Cyrillic: Муса Ћазим Ћатић; 12 March 1878 – 6 April 1915) was a Bosnian poet of the Bosnian-Herzegovinian Renaissance at the turn of the 20th century.

== Life ==
Ćatić completed Sharia Law studies in Zagreb. He worked as the editor of Behar and Biser magazines and in the Muslim Library of Mostar. He is today featured on the 50 convertible mark banknote of Bosnia and Herzegovina.

== Poetic style and influence ==
=== Esoteric ===
Ćatić was a poet by vocation and emotional structure who poetically experienced and imaginatively sublimated everything he came into contact with. Ćatić's poetry was life, the meaning of existence, the atmosphere of reality, and the medium in which his spirit ranged.

=== Mystic ===
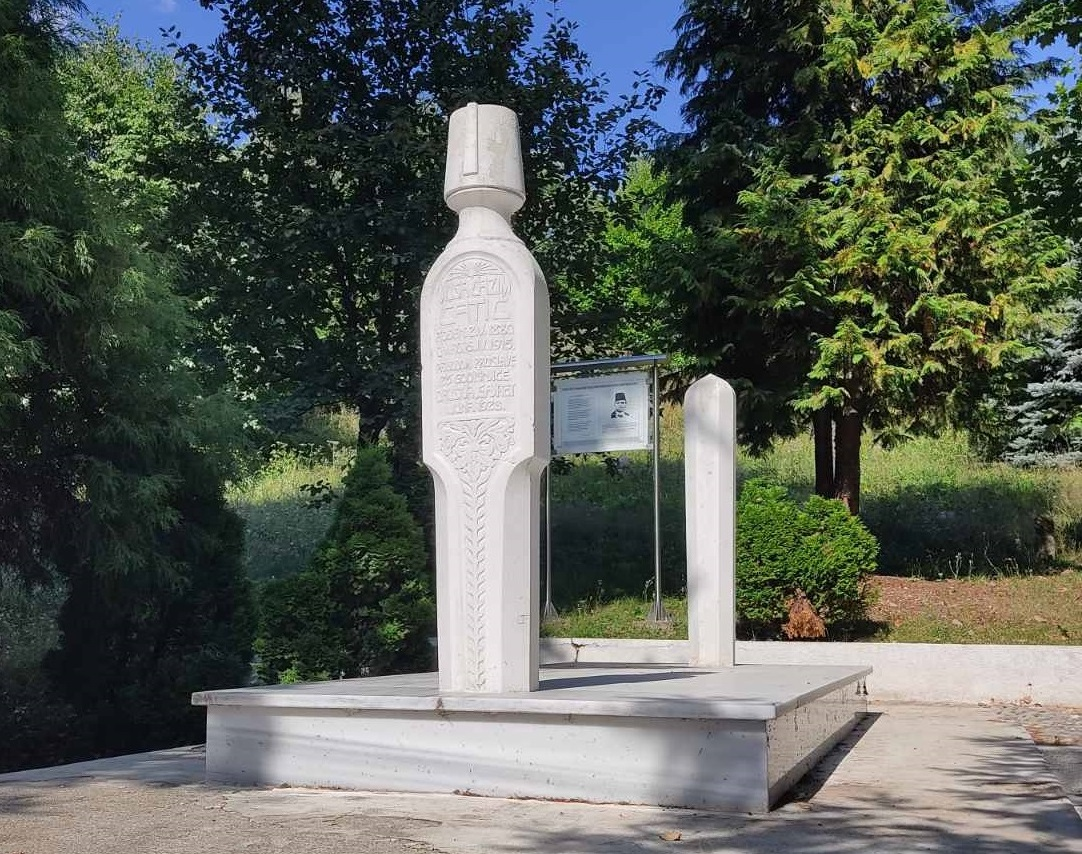
Grave of Musa Ćazim Ćatić in Tešanj

The poetic theme of Ćatić is situated, mainly, between two poles: eroticism by instinct and mysticism by spiritual endeavor, respectively. The combination of these motives sometimes occurred with a certain sense of spiritual distress, while sometimes sublimated in the form of sin, life and repentance as visioned by Epicurus and Khayyám. Mysticism though never separates Ćatić from reality and life; his mysticism, which draws on that of Turkish and Persian poets, rejects the pessimistic escapism of the spirit, similar to Baudelaire on whom Ćatić likewise draws.

=== Impact ===
Ćatić began in the style of his predecessor Safvet-beg Bašagić, standardized, with conventional instruments of versification and metrics, and a limited fund of metaphors from female folk songs and Eastern poetic symbols. But he soon made ground in the limited and underdeveloped poetic heritage surrounding him, spurring a small school of literary followers who would represent the second phase in the development of modern Bosnian poetry.

== Works ==
- Pjesme od godine 1900.-1908. (1914, compiled 1900–1908)
- Izvorna poezija and Izvorna i prevedena proza (1962, as "Sabrana dijela")
