= Edhem Mulabdić =

Bosnian writer

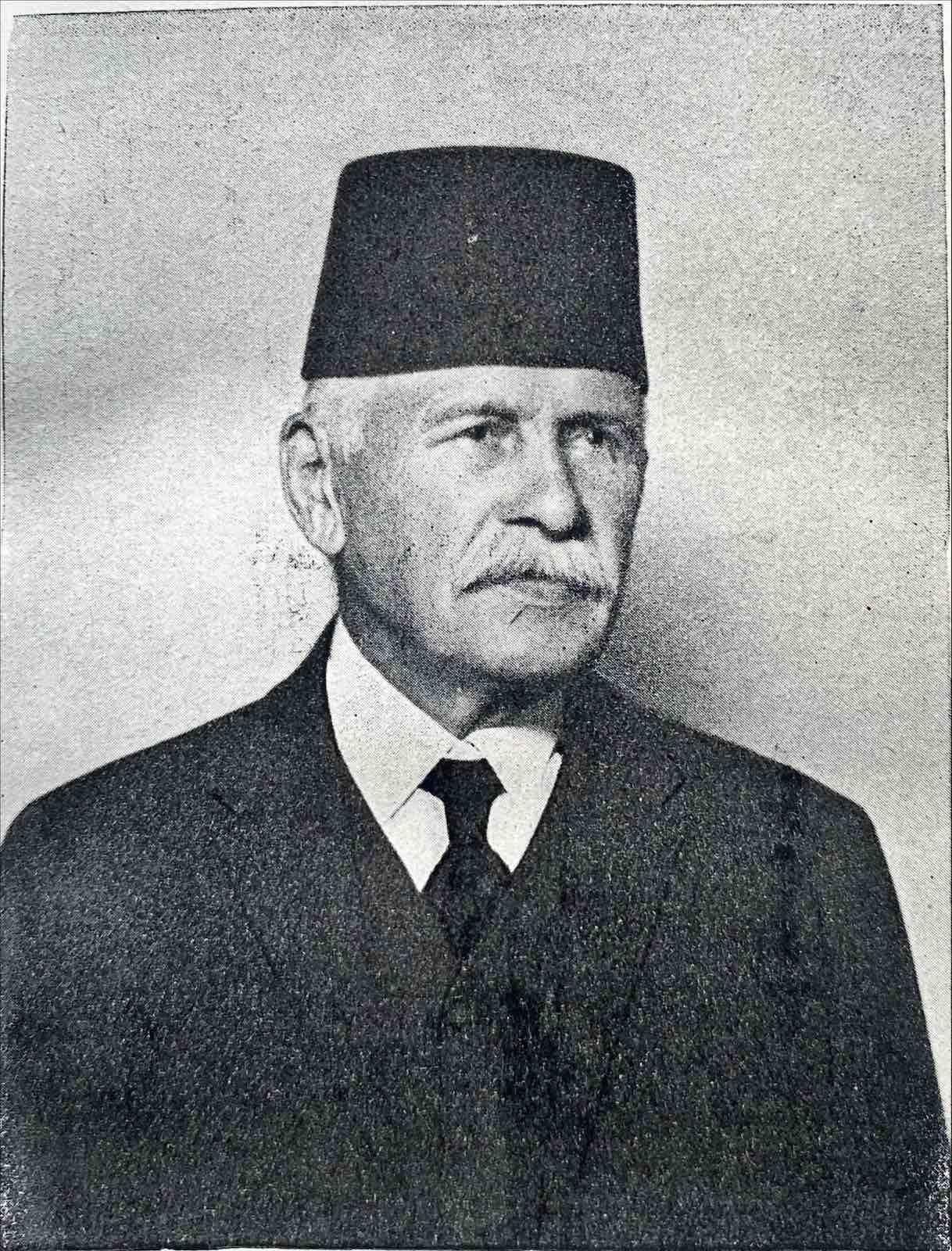
- Mulabdić in 1944
- Born: 19 October 1862; Maglaj, Bosnia Eyalet, Ottoman Empire
- Died: 29 January 1954 (aged 91); Sarajevo, SR Bosnia and Herzegovina, Yugoslavia
- Occupations: Novelist, historiographer
- Writing career
- Pen name: Ašik Garib
- Language: Croatian
- Period: 1892-1944
- Notable works: Zeleno busenje, first Bosniak novel

Edhem Mulabdić (19 October 1862 – 29 January 1954) was a Bosniak and Croatian writer and co-founder of the Bosniak political journal Behar. He is best known as the author of Zeleno busenje, the first Bosnian Muslim novel. He edited many political magazines including: Bošnjak, Gajret, Mearif, and Nada.

== Biography ==
Edhem Mulabdić was born to a Bosniak family in Maglaj in 1862, where he finished Islamic elementary school maktab and then got a job as a clerk. From Brčko he was transferred to Sarajevo, where he worked as a teacher at the Islamic school Dural-mualimmin. Soon he was elected to a national assembly in Maglaj. He stayed in that position until January 1929. Together with Safvet beg Bašagić and Osman Nuri Hadžić, Mulabdić would be one of the founders and originators of several welfare associations and publications, such as Behar in 1900 and Gajret in 1903.

His novel Zeleno busenje is regarded as the most significant work of this author, as well as the first Bosniak novel. Edhem Mulabdić's works would come to have huge importance of the development of the Bosniak culture and education in late 19th and early 20th century.

== Bibliography ==
=== Novels ===
- Zeleno busenje, Matica hrvatska, Zagreb, 1898
- Nova vremena, slika iz novijeg života u Bosni, Mostar, 1914
- Kumovi
- Garib
- Nišan
- Zekonja
- Tajno pismo

=== Stories ===
- Nesretan unuk
- Đuro Prepelica
- Aga i kmet
- Lov
- Tahiraga
- Šehiti
- Bajram
- Kućni rahatluk
- Uspomene u narodu

=== Others ===
- Kod starog djeda
- Osmanlija
- Rukovjet šale, Sarajevo, 1893
- Na obali Bosne (zbirka pripovijetki), Matica hrvatska, Zagreb
- Crtice, Sarajevo, 1907
- Izabrane pripovijesti, Matica hrvatska, Zagreb, 1944
- Svak na posao, Sarajevo, 1934
- Izabrana djela, Sarajevo, 1974

== Bibliography ==
- Begović, Filip Mursel, ed. (2024). "Stjepan Radić: Ima ih 600 hiljada, ja sam se uvjerio, nisu ni Hrvati ni Srbi" [Stjepan Radić: There are 600 thousands of them, I convinced myself that they're neither Croats or Serbs] (PDF). Bosna (2). Bošnjačko nacionalno vijeć: 148.
