= Serb Muslims =

Adherents of Islam from ethnic Serbs

Срби муслимани Srbi muslimani

Total population
- c. 4,500

Regions with significant populations
- Serbia: 4,238; Bosnia and Herzegovina: 94; Slovenia: 53

Languages
- Serbian

Religion
- Sunni Islam

Related ethnic groups
- Bosniaks, Gorani

Serb Muslims (Serbian: Срби муслимани, romanized: Srbi muslimani) or Serb Mohammedans (Срби мухамеданци, Srbi muhamedanci), historically referred to as Čitaci (Serbian Cyrillic: Читаци), are ethnic Serbs who are Muslims (adherents of Islam) by their religious affiliation.

== Terminology ==
The term Čitaci has several particular uses:

- The term derived from the Turkish "Çıtacı", a word used to refer to traders who sell wooden boards.
- In ethnographic, historical, and comparative religious studies it is used as a designation for Islamized families of ethnic Serb descent.
- It has been used as a self-identification in former Yugoslavia.
- It is used in historical studies to identify Ottoman people of Serb origin.

== History ==
Since Serbs were, and still are, predominantly Eastern Orthodox Christians, their first significant historical encounter with Islam occurred in the second half of the 14th century, and was marked by the Turkish invasion and conquest of Serbian lands (starting in 1371 and ending by the beginning of the 16th century). That interval was marked by the first wave of Islamization among Serbs. In some regions, a substantial minority left Christianity and converted to Islam, willingly or by necessity, under the influence of the Ottoman authorities. The most notable Muslim of Serb ethnicity was Mehmed-paša Sokolović (1506-1579), Grand Vizier of the Ottoman Empire (1565-1579), who was an ethnic Serb by birth, and so was Omar Pasha Latas.

=== World War I ===
Muslims joined the Serbian Army in World War I. The majority were Muslims who had a Serb identity, declaring as Serbs. Among notable soldiers were Mustafa Golubić, Avdo Hasanbegović, Šukrija Kurtović, Ibrahim Hadžimerović, Fehim Musakadić, Hamid Kukić, Rešid Kurtagić, who all fought as Serbian volunteer officers at the Salonica front. Among the most active in the group of Muslims who were engaged in Yugoslav propaganda on Austro-Hungarian Muslim POWs were A. Hasanbegović, Azis Sarić, F. Musakadić, Alija Džemidžić, R. Kurtagić, Asim Šeremeta, Hamid Kukić and Ibrahim Hadžiomerović.

=== Kingdom of Yugoslavia ===
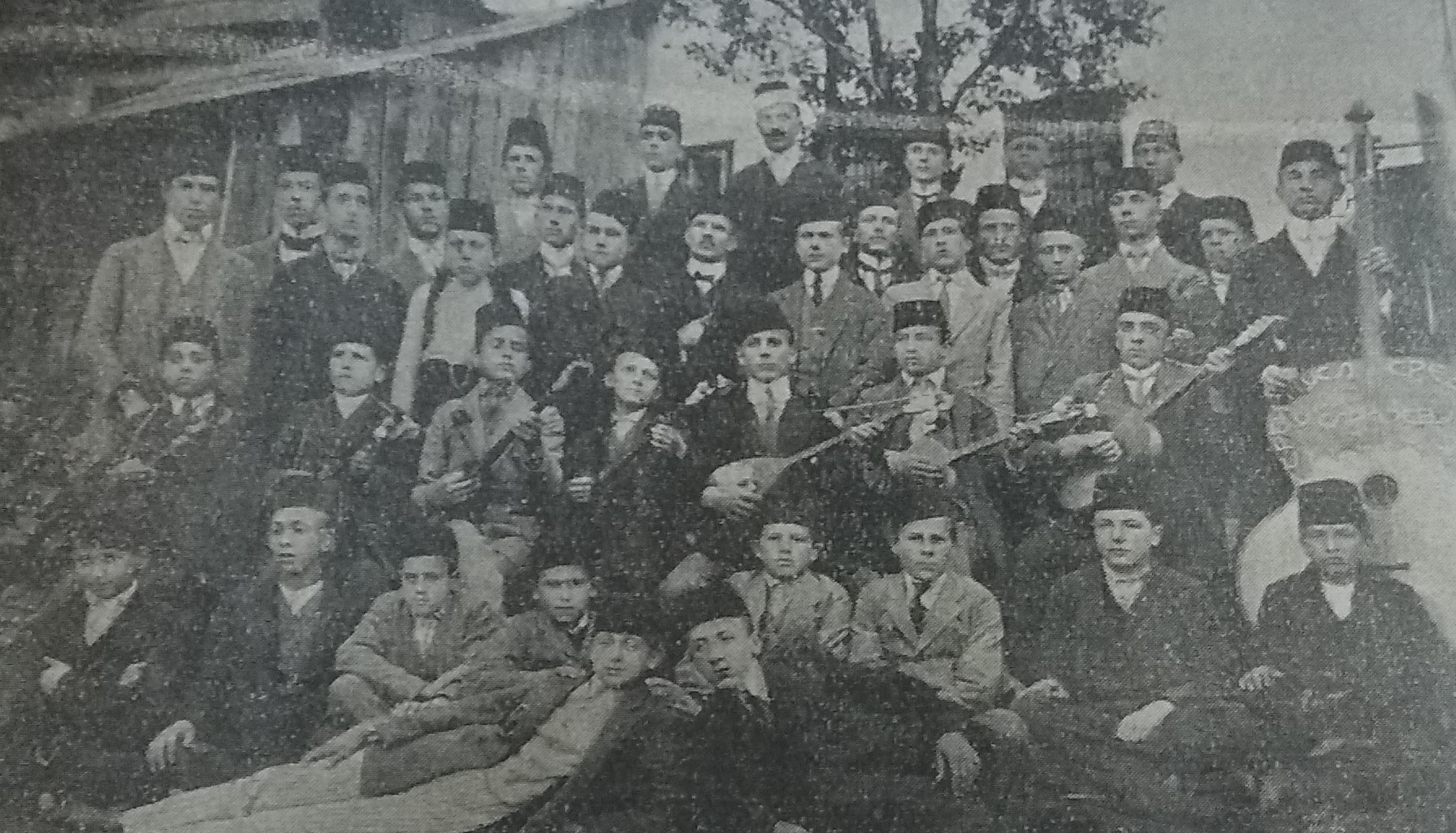
Serb Muslims in Sarajevo, 1913

Gajret (known as the Serbian Muslim Cultural Society after 1929) was a cultural society established in 1903 that promoted Serbian identity among the Slavic Muslims of Austria-Hungary (today's Bosnia and Herzegovina). The organization viewed that the Muslims were Serbs lacking ethnic consciousness. The view that Muslims were Serbs is probably the oldest of the three ethnic theories among the Bosnian Muslims themselves. It was dismantled by the Independent State of Croatia during World War II. Some members, non-Communists, joined or collaborated with the Yugoslav Partisans, while others joined the Chetniks.

=== World War II ===
During World War II in Yugoslavia, a few Muslims joined the Chetniks. They espoused a Serb ethnic identity. The most notable of these was Ismet Popovac, who commanded the Muslim National Military Organization (Muslimanska narodna vojna organizacija, MNVO). The resolution of MNVO states that "Muslims are an integral part of Serbdom". World War I veteran Fehim Musakadić also joined the Chetniks.

=== Socialist Yugoslavia ===
Before the 1971 census, those of Slavic Muslim background in Yugoslavia could only legally declare themselves as Serb Muslims, Croat Muslims, or ethnically-undecided Muslims. The overwhelming majority chose the option "undetermined". After 1971, Slavs of Muslim ancestry were recognized as an ethnic group in their own right.

Some prominent Muslims in Yugoslavia openly declared as Serbs, such as the writer Meša Selimović.

=== Breakup of Yugoslavia ===
During early talks of the partition of Bosnia and Herzegovina, Ejup Ganić remarked that the Bosniaks "are Islamized Serbs", and should thus join the Serb side, he said it at a time when the SDA shifted in favour of siding with the Serbs and continuing the struggle against the Croats.

Serb nationalists usually insisted that Bosniaks were Serbs that had abandoned their faith. Serbian historiography emphasizes the Orthodox Serbian origin of the Bosniaks who are interpreted as relinquishing ties to the ethno-religious heritage after converting to Islam and later denying it by refusing to accept a Serbian identity.

== Demographics ==
According to data from the 2022 Serbian census, of those who declared as ethnic Serbs, 0.08% (4,238) declared Islam as their religion.

== Notable people ==
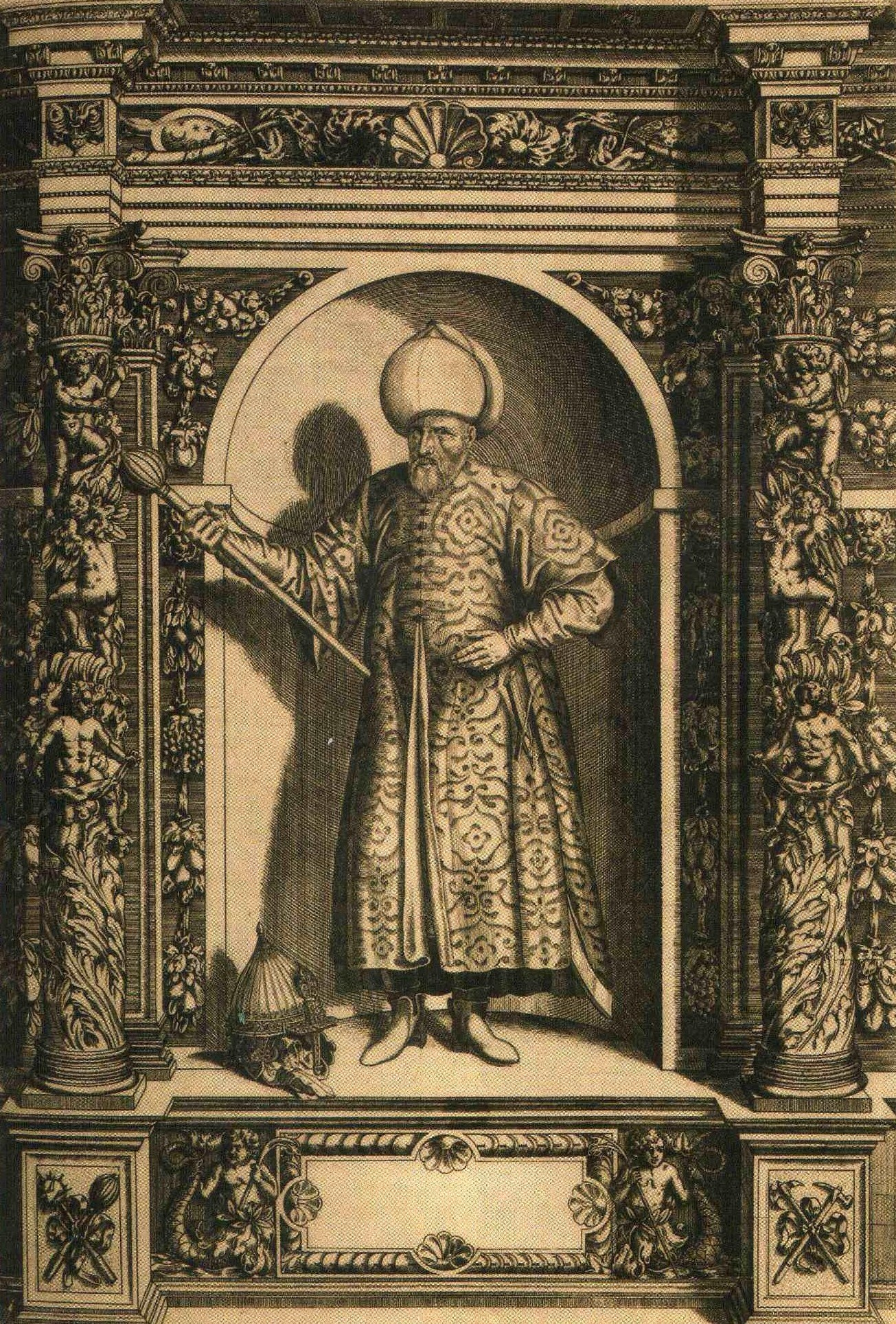
Mehmed-paša Sokolović

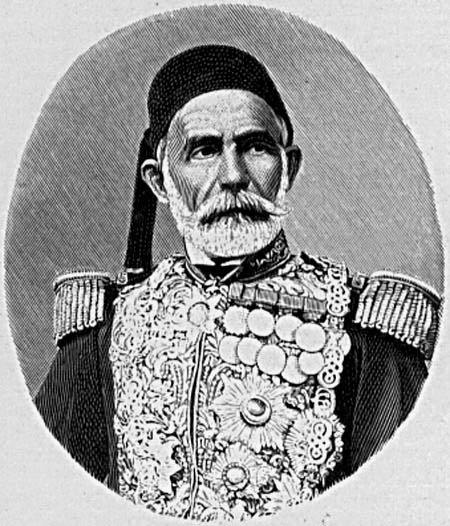
Omar Pasha Latas

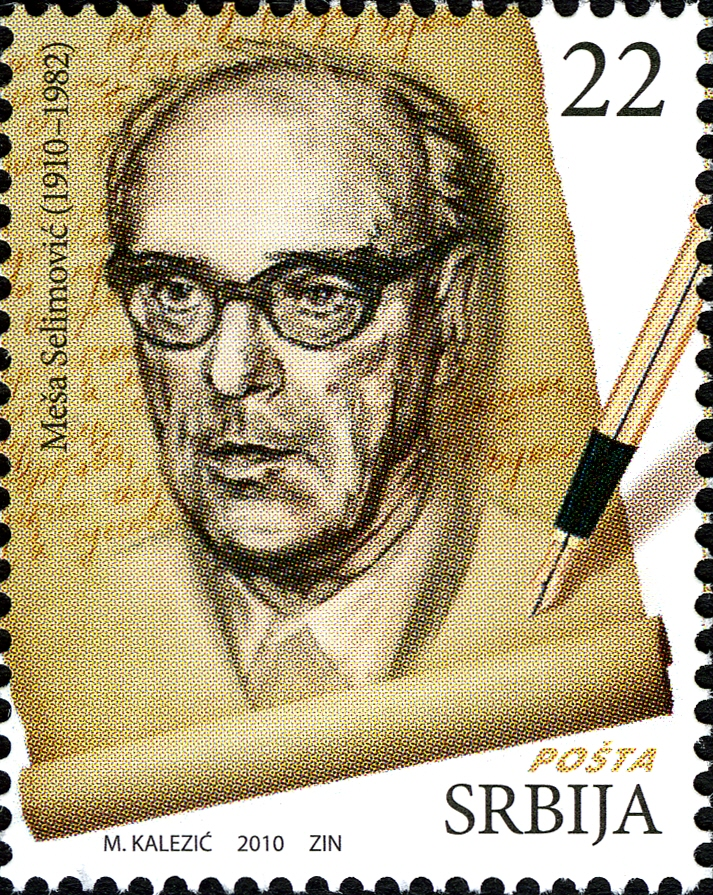
Meša Selimović

- Avdo Karabegović (1878–1908), Bosnian writer
- Osman Đikić (1879–1912), writer
- Avdo Sumbul (1884–1915), journalist and activist
- Muhamed Mehmedbašić (1886–1943), revolutionary
- Mustafa Golubić (1889–1941), Chetnik and Soviet intelligence officer
- Milan Bogdanović (1892–1964), writer and literary critic
- Hasan Rebac (1894–1953), writer
- Ismet Popovac (1902–1943), World War II Chetnik
- Fehim Musakadić (d. 1943), World War I Serbian soldier and World War II Chetnik
- Meša Selimović (1910–1982), writer
- Sulejman Spaho (1949–2025), politician
- Mustafa Mijajlović (b. 1972), sports commentator
- Ivan Ejub Kostić, (b. 1979), political scientist and islamologist
- Dunja Ilić (b. 1991), singer and songwriter

== See also ==
- Islam in Serbia
- Bosniaks of Serbia

== Sources ==
- Allworth, Edward (1994). Muslim Communities Reemerge: Historical Perspectives on Nationality, Politics, and Opposition in the Former Soviet Union and Yugoslavia. Duke University Press. ISBN 0-8223-1490-8.
- Ceribašić-Begovac, Anaid (2017). Die Muslime im Sandschak Smederevo am Übergang vom 18. ins 19. Jahrhundert - Ein Vergleich zwischen der serbischen und bosnischen wissenschaftlichen Literatur (PDF) (Thesis). University of Graz.
- Ethnicity/National Affiliation, Religion and Mother Tongue (PDF). Sarajevo: Agency for Statistics of Bosnia and Herzegovina. 2019.
- "Population by ethnicity and religion, by region". Belgrade: Statistical Office of the Republic of Serbia. 14 June 2023.
- Вукићевић, Миленко M. (1901). Знаменити Срби мухамеданци (Prominent Serb Muhamedans). Београд.
- Вукићевић, Миленко M. (1906). Знаменити Срби мусломани (Prominent Serb Muslims). Београд: Српска књижевна задруга.
- Вукићевић, Миленко M. (1998). Знаменити Срби муслимани (Prominent Serb Muslims). Београд: ННК.
- Раковић, Александар (2016). "Српски идентитет муслимана словенског порекла на постјугословенском простору у 21. веку (The Serb identity of Muslims of Slavic origin on post-Yugoslav space in the 21st century)" (PDF). Култура полиса: Часопис за неговање демократске политичке културе. 13 (31): 171–183. Archived from the original (PDF) on 2017-03-02.
- Republički zavod za statistiku Srbije (2014). "Etnomozaik" (PDF). Belgrade: Republički zavod za statistiku Srbije.
- Trbovich, Ana S. (2008). A Legal Geography of Yugoslavia's Disintegration. Oxford University Press, USA. pp. 100–. ISBN 978-0-19-533343-5.
