= Avdić =

Avdić is a mainly Bosniak surname derived from the male given name Avdo. Notable people with the surname include:

- Adem Avdić (born 2007), Serbian footballer
- Alen Avdić (born 1977), Bosnian footballer
- Azra Avdic (born 1998), Peruvian swimmer
- Demir Avdić (born 1990), Serbian footballer
- Denis Avdić (born 1982), Slovenian comedian
- Denni Avdić (born 1988), Swedish footballer
- Marcel Avdić (born 1991), Bosnian footballer
- Mehmed Avdić (born 1998), footballer
- Muamer Avdić (born 1993), Bosnian footballer
- Rašid Avdić (born 1980), Serbian-born Bosnian footballer
- Selvedin Avdić (born 1969), Bosnian writer
