= Avdo =

Avdo is a Serbo-Croatian hypocorism of Abdullah found mainly in Bosnia and Herzegovina.

It may refer to:

- Avdo Humo (1914–1983), Bosnian communist politician
- Avdo Jabučica (died 1878), Ottoman Bosnian blacksmith
- Avdo Kalajdžić (born 1959), Bosnian football manager and former player
- Avdo Karabegović Hasanbegov (1878–1900), Bosnian poet
- S. Avdo Karabegović (1878–1908), Bosnian and Serbian poet
- Avdo Međedović (c. 1875–1955), gusle player and oral poet from Sandžak
- Avdo Spahić (born 1998), Bosnian-German footballer
- Avdo Sumbul (1884–1915), Serb Muslim editor and national activist
- Avdo Palić (1958–1995), Bosnian military officer
