= Karabegović =

Karabegović is a Bosniak surname derived from the Turkish words "kara" meaning "black" and "beg" meaning "lord" therefore the surname roughly translates to "son of the black lord". Notable people with the surname include:

- Avdo Karabegović Hasanbegov (1878–1900), Bosnian poet
- S. Avdo Karabegović (1878–1908), Bosnian poet
- Osman Karabegović (1911–1996), Yugoslav and Bosnian politician
