= Ali Pasha Mosque (Sarajevo) =

Mosque in Sarajevo, Bosnia and Herzegovina

- Alipašina džamija
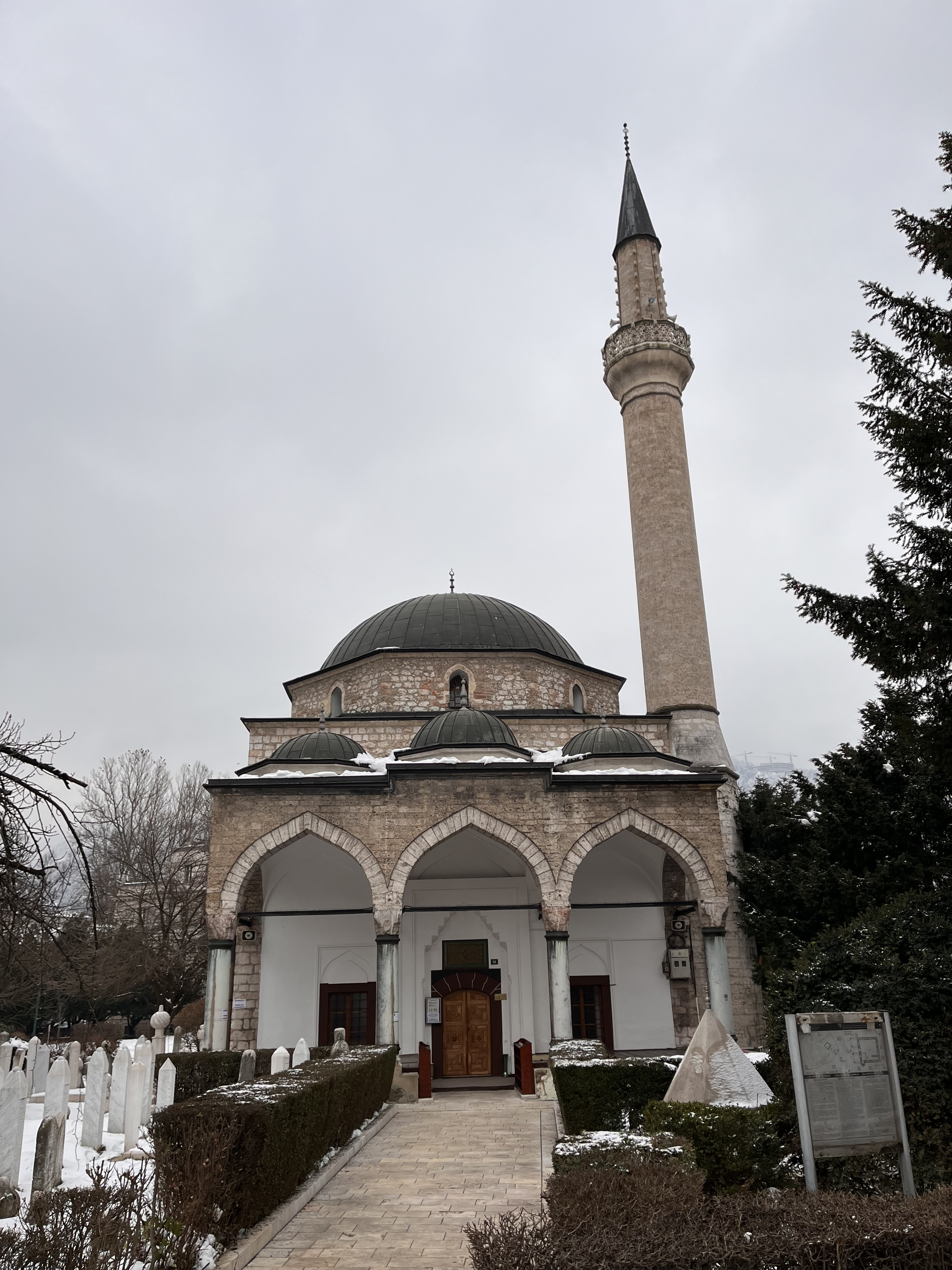

Religion
- Affiliation: Sunni Islam
- Ecclesiastical or organisational status: Mosque
- Status: Active

Location
- Location: Centar, Sarajevo
- Country: Bosnia and Herzegovina
- Interactive map of Ali Pasha Mosque
- Coordinates: 43°51′28.5″N 18°24′45.5″E

Architecture
- Type: Mosque
- Style: Ottoman
- Funded by: Sofu Hadım Ali Pasha
- Completed: 1561

Specifications
- Dome: 4
- Minaret: 1

KONS of Bosnia and Herzegovina
- Official name: Ali-pasha mosque with the harem, the architectural ensemble
- Type: Category I cultural monument
- Criteria: II. Value; A, B, C i.ii.iii.iv.v.vi., D iv.v., E i.ii.iii.iv.v., F ii.iii., G i.ii.iii.iv.vi.vii., H ii. I i.ii.iii.
- Designated: 25 January 2005
- Reference no.: 2523
- Decision no.: 06.2-2-128/04-6
- Listed: List of National Monuments of Bosnia and Herzegovina

The Ali Pasha Mosque (Bosnian: Ali-pašina džamija; Turkish: Ali Paşa Camii) is a mosque in the Centar neighbourhood of Sarajevo, Bosnia and Herzegovina. It was constructed during 1560–61 as a vakıf—the legacy or perpetual endowment—of Sofu Hadım Ali Pasha, an Ottoman statesman who served as the governor of the Bosnia Eyalet of the Ottoman Empire amongst other roles, after his death in September 1560.

== Description ==
The mosque was built according to the classical Ottoman architectural style. A dome covers the prayer area and three smaller domes cover the cloister. Its proportions make it the largest sub-dome mosque in Bosnia and Herzegovina. The grounds of the complex contain a mausoleum (türbe) with two sarcophagi—those of Avdo Sumbul and Behdžet Mutevelić, Gajret activists who died in the dungeons of Arad.

The Ali Pasha Mosque was slightly damaged by Serbian forces during the Bosnian War of the early 1990s, especially the dome. The most recent renovation of the mosque occurred in 2004; and, in January 2005, the Commission to Preserve National Monuments added the Ali Pasha Mosque to the List of National Monuments of Bosnia and Herzegovina.

== See also ==
- Islam in Bosnia and Herzegovina
- List of mosques in Bosnia and Herzegovina
- List of National Monuments of Bosnia and Herzegovina
