= Sulejman Spaho =

Serbian politician (1949–2025)

- Сулејман Спахо
- Born: 16 June 1949; Aleksinac, PR Serbia, FPR Yugoslavia
- Died: 21 September 2025 (aged 76)
- Occupation: Politician
- Years active: 2003–2012
- Known for: Member, National Assembly (Serbia)
- Notable work: Founder and President of "Association of Serbs of the Islamic religion"
- Political party: Serbian Radical Party

Sulejman Spaho (Serbian Cyrillic: Сулејман Спахо; 16 June 1949 – 21 September 2025) was a Serbian politician who served as a Member of the National Assembly from 2003 to 2012 as a member of the far-right Serbian Radical Party.

== Early life and political career ==
Sulejman Spaho was born to a Bosnian Muslim family from Sarajevo on 16 June 1949, in Aleksinac, where his father was serving in the Yugoslav People's Army. Not long after, his family moved from Aleksinac to Loznica and Spaho grew up there. Spaho's paternal grand-uncle Mehmed Spaho was a government minister in the Kingdom of Yugoslavia and the most influential Bosnian Muslim politician at that time.

He played handball for RK Metaloplastika, worked as a VK electrician in a company Viskoza, where he was fired, after which he sold paprika at the market.

Spaho joined the far-right and ultranationalist Serbian Radical Party (SRS) of Vojislav Šešelj in the early 1990s and participated in the Croatian War of Independence and the Bosnian War on the Serb side.

He became a Member of the National Assembly in 2003 as a replacement for another MP who died, and has been re-elected in the 2007 and 2008 parliamentary elections. Spaho also received 50th position on the SRS electoral list for the 2016 parliamentary elections but the list gained only 22 seats.

Spaho was photographed in August 2008 giving money to naked dancers at the Malibu nightclub in Loznica. After the photos leaked to public, Spaho stated that the dancers were photoshopped into the photo. When the declaration on the Srebrenica Massacre was discussed, he was not present in the assembly hall, and he will be remembered for encouraging Ratko Mladić, then a fugitive, to never surrender.

== Personal life and death ==
Spaho declared himself as an ethnic Serb and a Muslim Serb, however, although he declared himself a Muslim, fellow MPs claimed that he did not observe Ramadan. After finishing his MP career, Spaho had been participating in a Serbian reality show Parovi which is broadcast on Happy TV.

He was the President of the non-governmental organization "Association of Serbs of the Islamic religion", which he founded with the goal of educating as many citizens of Serbia who declare themselves as Muslim Serbs, as well as to spread historical facts about this population.

Spaho died on 21 September 2025, at the age of 76.
