= Hasan Rebac =

Yugoslav politician

- Born: 1894; Mostar, Condominium of Bosnia and Herzegovina, Austria-Hungary
- Died: 4 August 1953 (aged 58–59); Belgrade, PR Serbia, FPR Yugoslavia
- Occupation: Politician
- Spouse: Anica Savić (m. 1921)
- Relatives: Milan Savić (father-in-law)

Hasan Rebac (1894 – 4 August 1953) was a Yugoslav politician. Rebac married Serbian writer Anica Savić in April 1921. They remained married until his death 32 years later.

In the autumn of 1930, Rebac moved with his wife to Skopje in Macedonia. They remained there until the invasion of Yugoslavia in 1941, when they escaped back to Belgrade as war refugees.

== Death and aftermath ==
The same night that Rebac died after a serious illness, Anica attempted suicide by slitting her wrists. Two months later, the grief-stricken Anica committed suicide by shooting her heart with a revolver.
