= Anica Savić Rebac =

Serbian writer, classical philologist, professor (1892–1953)

Anica Savić-Rebac
- Аница Савић-Ребац
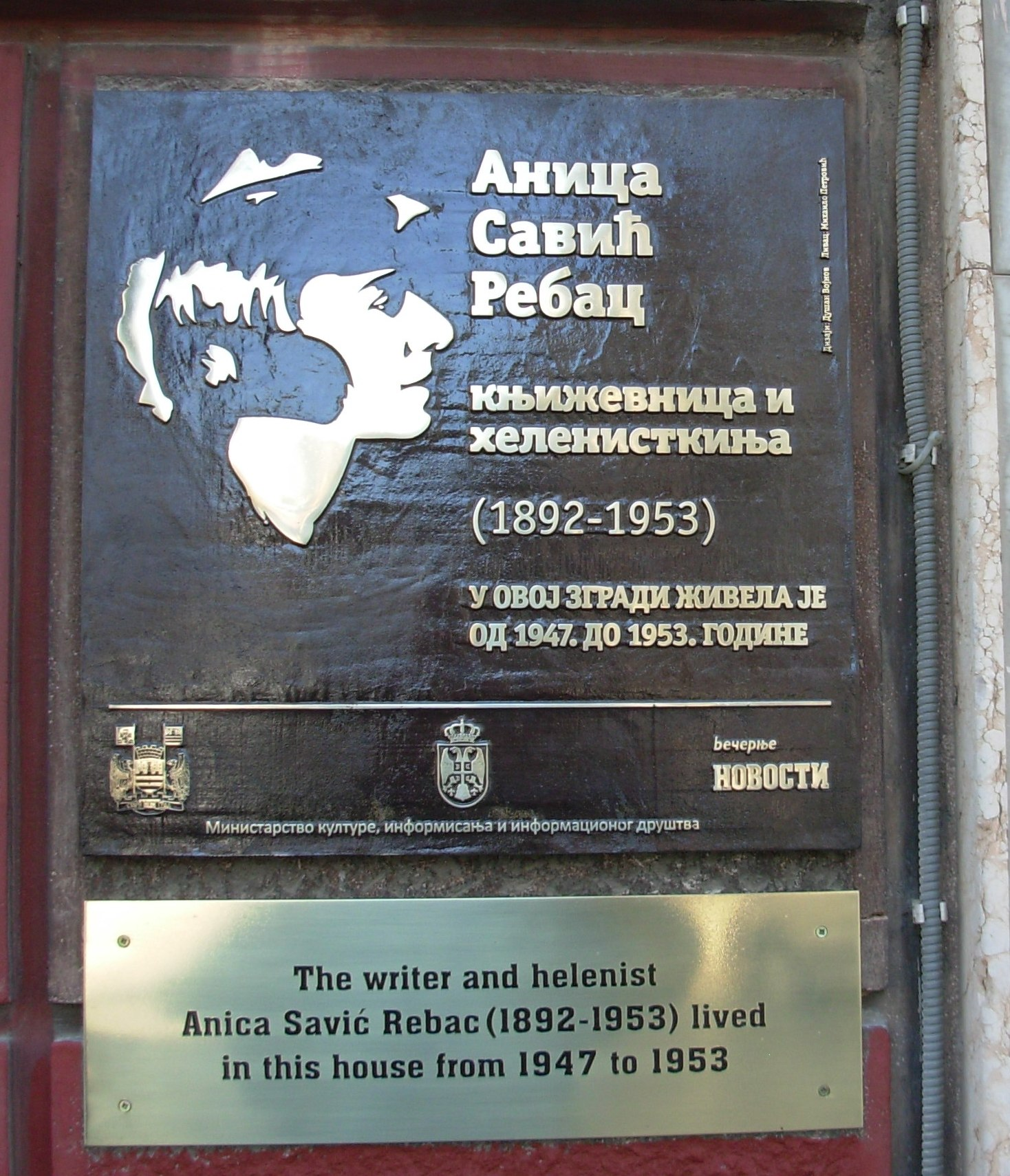
- Plaque on the house where Savić Rebac lived
- Born: Anica Savić; 4 October 1892; Újvidék, Kingdom of Hungary, Austria-Hungary
- Died: 7 October 1953 (aged 61); Belgrade, PR Serbia, FPR Yugoslavia
- Spouse: Hasan Rebac (m. 1921; died 1953)
- Father: Milan Savić

Anica Savić-Rebac (Serbian Cyrillic: Аница Савић-Ребац; 4 October 1892 — 7 October 1953) was a Serbian writer, classical philologist, translator, professor at the University of Belgrade.

== Biography ==
She graduated from the gymnasium in her hometown of Novi Sad as the only woman in her class. Her further education in Vienna was interrupted by the outbreak of World War I. In 1920 she graduated from the University of Belgrade.

She wrote a number of essays and books about Njegoš, Goethe, Sophocles, Spinoza, Thomas Mann, Greek mystical philosophers, Plato, theory of literature. She also translated a number of works from Serbian into English, most notably The Ray of the Microcosm by Petar II Petrović-Njegoš.

Anica Savić Rebac appears under the name of Milica in travel book Black Lamb and Grey Falcon by Rebecca West. In this book she is not only a new friend, but also the intellectual guide who eventually reveals to Rebecca West the rituals which would lead the author to the clue metaphor of her vision of the Balkans.

Author Ljiljana Vuletić published a book about her life.

== Works ==
- Geteov Helenizam (1933)
- Ljubav u filozofiji Spinozinoj (1933)
- Mistična i tragična misao kod Grka (1934)
- Štefan George (1934)
- Platonska i hrišćanska ljubav (1936)
- Kallistos (1937)
- Tomas Man i problematika naših dana (1937)
- Njegoš, Kabala i Filon
- Njegoš i bogumilstvo
- Pesnik i njeogova pozicija
- Večeri na moru (1929)
- Predplatonska erotologija (1932),
- Antička estetika i nauka o književnosti (1954)
- Helenski vidici (1966)

Translations

- The Ray of the Microcosm (1957)
- Der Strahl des Mikrocosmos
