= Laza Lazarević =

Serbian writer and psychiatrist (1851–1891)

- Born: Lazar Lazarević; 13 May 1851; Šabac, Principality of Serbia
- Died: 10 January 1891 (aged 39); Belgrade, Kingdom of Serbia
- Resting place: Belgrade New Cemetery
- Occupations: Writer, psychiatrist and neurologist
- Writing career
- Notable works: Prvi put s ocem na jutrenje, Sve će to narod pozlatiti

Lazar "Laza" Lazarević (Serbian Cyrillic: Лазаp Лаза Лазаревић, 13 May 1851 – 10 January 1891) was a Serbian writer, psychiatrist, and neurologist.

== Medical career ==
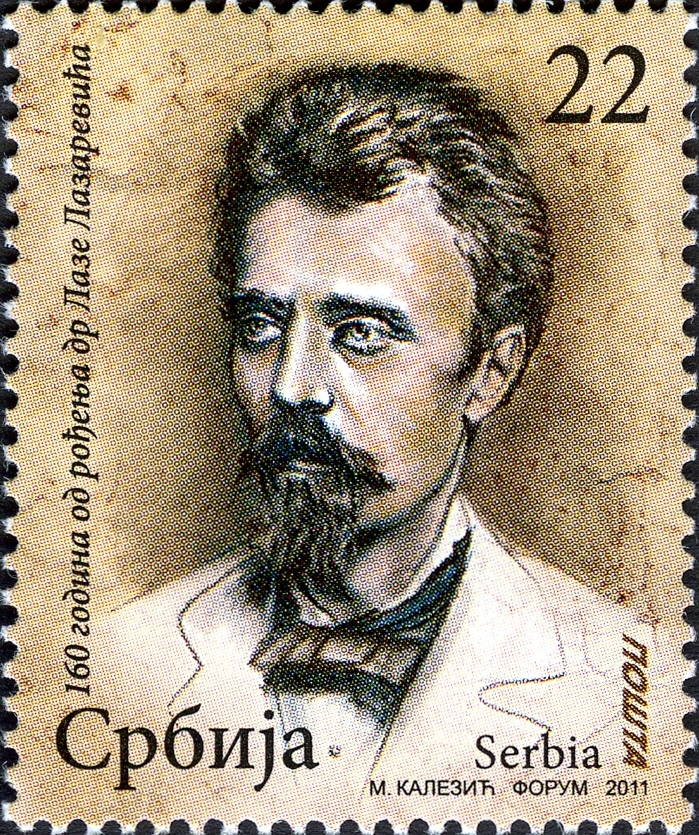
Laza Lazarević on a 2011 Serbian stamp

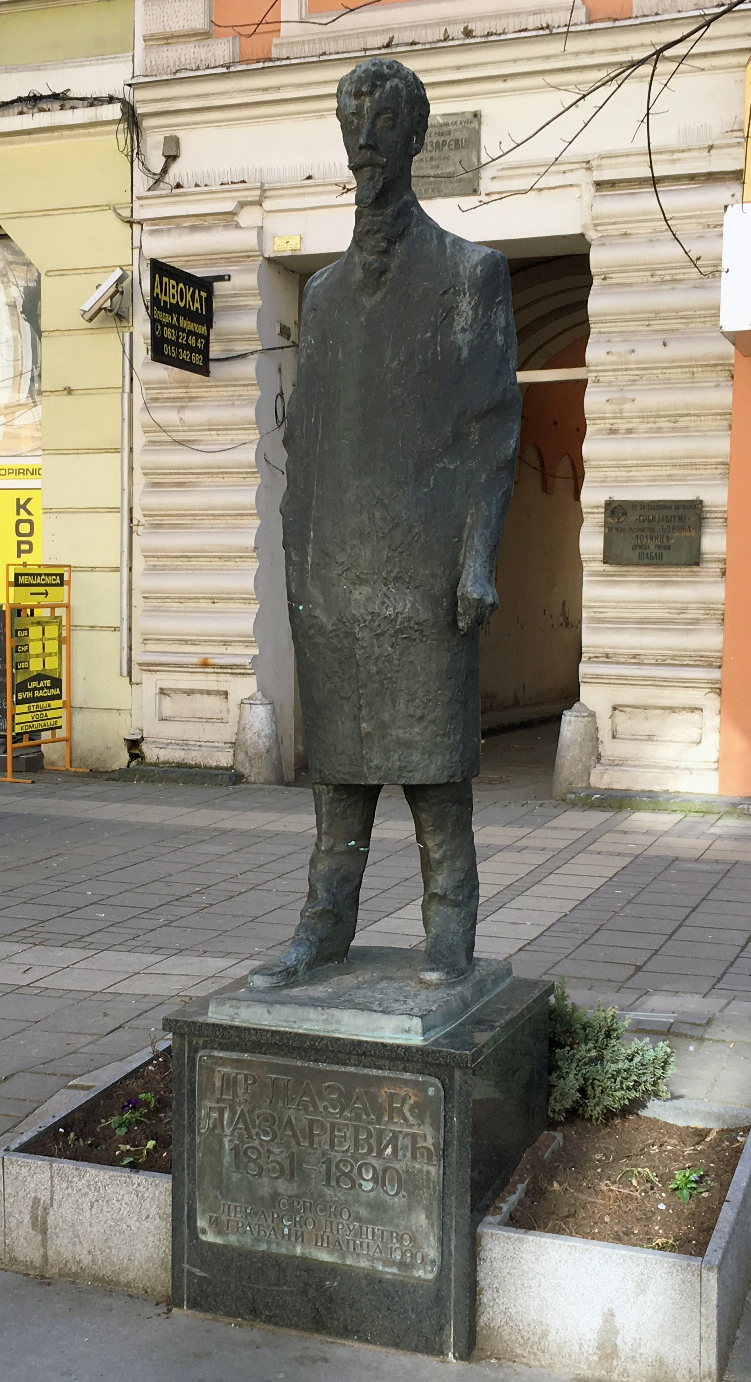
Monument to Laza Lazarević in his hometown Šabac

Lazarević was born in Šabac in 1851. He studied medicine at the University of Berlin Medical School.

After graduating, he became a physician in Belgrade and in 1881, he was appointed Head Doctor and Chief of the Internal Department of the General State Hospital in Belgrade. Later, he became King Milan Obrenović IV's personal doctor.

As a physician, he made significant contributions to the development of medicine in Serbia. He published 72 medical and scientific papers, particularly on diseases targeting the nervous system. The first cataracts operation in Serbia was performed by Lazarević and in 1884 he was the first doctor to be sent as an envoy to Austria to learn about animal lymphatic systems. He founded the first modern geriatric hospital.

He participated as a field doctor in the Serbo-Turkish War of 1876 and 1878 and he was a major organizer of the Great Reserve Hospital in Niš during the Serbo-Bulgarian War of 1885, initially as medical major and then vice-colonel.

== Writing ==
In addition to his native Serbian, Lazarević was fluent in Russian, French and German. Although he was a doctor by profession, writing took up a great deal of his time. He published nine short stories. His early writings were influenced by the socialist ideals of Svetozar Marković before shifting to a more conservative position. Despite the small body of work, his stories have been analyzed for their artistic and social contexts. His contributions to Serbian literature are significant.

He was a member of several Serbian learned societies, including SANU and his works were translated into numerous languages.

== Legacy ==
He is included in The 100 most prominent Serbs and he was elected a member of Parnassos Literary Society.

== Works ==
- Prvi put s ocem na jutrenje, 1879
- Školska ikona, 1880
- Na bunaru, 1880
- U dobri čas hajduci, 1880
- Verter, 1881
- Švabica, 1881
- Sve će to narod pozlatiti, 1882
- Šest pripovedaka, 1886
- Vetar, 1888
- On zna sve, 1890
- Pripovetke L. K. Lazarevića I, 1898
- Pripovetke L. K. Lazarevića II, 1899

== See also ==
- Jovan Jovanović Zmaj
- Julije Bajamonti
- Vladan Đorđević
- Miodrag Pavlović
- Milan Savić
- Vladan Radoman

== Sources ==
- Jovan Skerlić, Istorija Nove Srpske Književnosti / History of New Serbian Literature (Belgrade, 1921), pp. 378–384.
