= Gajret =

Cultural society

- Formation: 1903
- Founders: Safvet-beg Bašagić; Edhem Mulabdić; Osman Đikić
- Defunct: 1941
- Headquarters: Sarajevo

Gajret was a society for supporting Bosnian Muslims students of high and high schools in Bosnia and Herzegovina and the Austro-Hungarian Monarchy.

== History ==
After the 1914 Assassination of Archduke Franz Ferdinand leadership of the association was interned in Arad.

The organization viewed that the South-Slavic Muslims were Serbs lacking ethnic consciousness. The view that South-Slavic Muslims were Serbs is probably the oldest of three ethnic theories among the Bosnian Muslims themselves. After the Austro-Hungarian occupation of Bosnia and Herzegovina, the Bosnian Muslims, feeling threatened by Catholic Habsburg rule, established several organizations. These included, apart from Gajret, the Muslim National Organization (1906) and the United Muslim Organization (1911). In 1912, after the death of Osman Đikić, the editing of Gajret was entrusted to Avdo Sumbul.

Gajret's main rival was the organization Narodna Uzdanica, established in 1924. In interwar Yugoslavia, members experienced persecution at the hands of non-Serbs due to their political inclinations. In this period association run a number of student dormitories in Mostar, Sarajevo, Belgrade and Novi Pazar.

During World War II, the association was dismantled by the Independent State of Croatia. Some members, non-Communists, joined or collaborated with the Yugoslav Partisans (such as M. Sudžuka, Z. Šarac, H. Brkić, H. Ćemerlić, and M. Zaimović). Ismet Popovac and Fehim Musakadić joined the Chetniks.

In 1945, a new Muslim organization, Preporod, was founded in order to replace the pro-Serb Gajret and pro-Croat Narodna Uzdanica. The former organizations voted for and were merged into Preporod. In 1996 it was reestablished as a Bosniak cultural association.

== Notable members ==
- Osman Đikić (founder)
- Safvet-beg Bašagić (founder)
- Edhem Mulabdić (founder)
- Avdo Sumbul
- Osman Nuri Hadžić
- Ismet Popovac
- Fehim Musakadić
- Muhamed Sudžuka
- Zaim Šarac
- Husein Brkić
- Hamdija Ćemerlić
- Murat-beg Zaimović

== See also ==
- Prosvjeta (1902)

== Sources ==
- Allworth, Edward (1994). Muslim Communities Reemerge: Historical Perspectives on Nationality, Politics, and Opposition in the Former Soviet Union and Yugoslavia. Duke University Press. ISBN 0-8223-1490-8.
- Greble, Emily (2011). Sarajevo 1941–1945: Muslims, Christians, and Jews in Hitler's Europe. Cornell University Press. pp. 15, 34–35, 39, 121, 124, 163, 235, 237. ISBN 978-0-8014-6121-7.
- Hoare, Marko Attila (2007). The History of Bosnia: From the Middle Ages to the Present Day. Saqi. pp. 131–133. ISBN 978-0-86356-953-1.
- Hoare, Marko Attila (2013). The Bosnian Muslims in the Second World War. Oxford University Press. pp. 41, 44, 68, 142, 126–7, 144–5, 171, 176, 356. ISBN 978-0-19-936531-9.
