= Vladan Radoman =

Serbian physician writer (1936–2015)

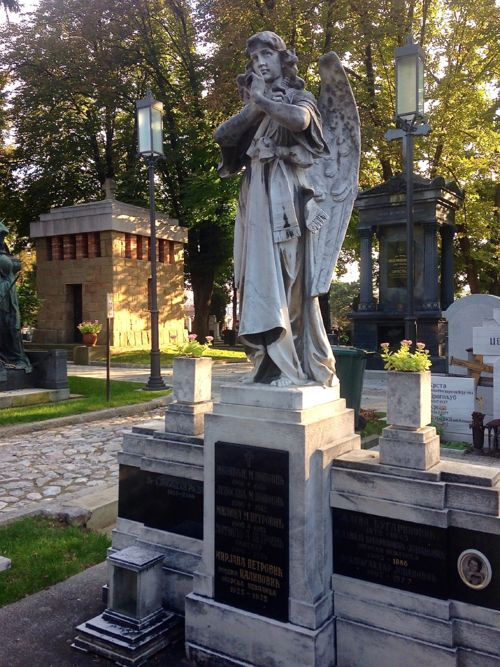
Radoman's grave in Belgrade

Vladan Radoman (1936 – 20 October 2015) was a Serbian physician writer. He grew up in his native country, with both his parents and his brother. He studied medicine in Belgrade.

== Life ==
Born in Novi Sad, he settled in Paris. He began his medical studies again, his Yugoslav diploma not being recognized. He then became an anesthetist-reanimator.

In 1967, the Biafran war began as a result of the secession of the eastern region of Nigeria, which proclaimed itself the Republic of Biafra. With government troops carrying out a land and sea blockade, the region was plunged into famine, resulting in an estimated one to two million deaths. This war was widely publicized at the international level, which will push doctors to go and help the refugees. He then went on a mission with other French doctors: Marcel Delcourt, Max Recamier, Gérard Pigeon, Bernard Kouchner, Raymond Borel, Jean Cabrol, Jean-Michel Wild, Pascal Grellety Bosviel, Jacques Bérés, Gérard Illiouz, Philippe Bernier, Xavier Emmanuelli, and Louis Schittly.

This war was at the origin of the foundation of Médecins sans frontières in 1971.

On the occasion of Operation "A Boat for Vietnam" in 1979, Bernard Kouchner wanted to charter a boat with doctors and journalists to testify to the violations of Human Rights in that country. He also wanted to evacuate the Vietnamese who had fled their communist country. There was a violent quarrel at the origin of a split within the management of MSF who considered the operation too media oriented. Bernard Kouchner then left MSF definitively and created the organization Médecins du monde with fifteen other doctors in 1980.

In 1982, the writer released his first book: Un pays en exil, then two years later Le Ravin which was awarded both the Prix Sainte-Beuve 1984 and the Prix Biguet of the Académie française.

In 1999, he received the medal of Chevalier of the Légion d'Honneur from the hands of writer Michel Mohrt.

At the age of 65, he stopped practicing medicine. He then devoted himself entirely to writing. In 2004, he left France to settle in Belgrade, where he continued to write books, but in Serbian this time.

In 2007, La luciole de glace ("Ledeni Svitac") was staged at the Madlenianum Opera and Theatre of Zemun.

Being ill, Vladan Radoman returned to France in 2015 and died on 26 October 2015 in Nice.

== Publications ==
- 1979: La faute, Les Cahiers Indépendants
- 1982: Un Pays en exil, Calmann-Lévy
- 1984: Le Ravin, Olivier Orban - Prix Sainte-Beuve, Prix Biguet of the Académie française
- 1986: Les Dépossédés, Olivier Orban
- 1991: Les filles de Belgrade ne m’ont jamais aimé, Éditions de la Table ronde
- 1993: Le sourire de l’accordéoniste, Table ronde
- 1995: Luciole de glace, Table ronde
- 1997: Harmonikašev osmeh (Le sourire de l'accordéoniste), Stubovi kulture
- 2000: Čarobnjak iz Aza (Le magicien d'Az), Vračarski breg
- 2000: La Ballade d’un yougo : Bleu mistral, Orphelin de mer, 6 rue Bonaparte, Série noire n° 2571 and 2576
- 2002: Y a-t-il une vie sexuelle après la mort ?, Série noire n° 2654
- 2003: Ma langue au chat, Éditions du Rocher
- 2003: Predajem se (Ma langue au chat), Zepter book world
- 2005: La règle de trois, Table ronde
- 2008: Ima li seksualnog života posle smrti (Y a-t-il une vie sexuelle après la mort), Paideia
- 2012: Beogradske devojke me nikada nicu volele (Les filles de Belgrade ne m'ont jamais aimé), Gutenbergov galaksija
- 2012: Portes vertes, Les Editions Persée
- 2014: Mimohod, Albatros Plus

== See also ==
- Laza Lazarević
- Milan Savić
- Jovan Stejić
