= Ismet Popovac =

Bosnian Muslim lawyer, physician, and Chetnik leader

- Born: 8 December 1902; Mostar, Austro-Hungarian occupied Bosnia and Herzegovina
- Died: 21 August 1943 (aged 40); Near Trebinje, Independent State of Croatia (present-day Bosnia and Herzegovina)
- Military career
- Allegiance: Chetniks (1941–1943); Italy (1942–1943)
- Service years: 1941–1943
- Commands: Muslim People's Military Organization
- Conflicts: World War II in Yugoslavia: Operation Weiss

Ismet Popovac (Serbian Cyrillic: Исмет Поповац; 8 December 1902 – 21 August 1943) was a Bosnian Muslim physician who led a Muslim Chetnik militia known as the Muslim People's Military Organization (MNVO) in Bosnia and Herzegovina during World War II. He was active in pre-war Yugoslav politics, becoming a member of the Serbian Muslim cultural organization Gajret and serving as the mayor of Konjic, a town in northern Herzegovina. He is also said to have been candidate for Vladko Maček's electoral list, but was left without a job in the Yugoslav state government after the creation of the Banovina of Croatia in August 1939.

Following the Axis invasion of Yugoslavia in April 1941, Popovac joined the Chetnik movement of Draža Mihailović. Popovac was a proponent of Bosnian Muslim cooperation with the Chetniks and suggested that they recruit Muslims into their ranks. In October 1942, he enlisted Italian aid in fighting the communist Partisans, and later visited Prozor to discourage further bloodshed after a Chetnik massacre that took the lives of as many as 2,500 Muslim and Croat civilians. In early 1943, he led an attack against a Muslim village. Later that year, he was killed in disputed circumstances near the town of Trebinje.

== Early life ==
Ismet Popovac was born in Mostar, in Austro-Hungarian occupied Bosnia and Herzegovina, on 8 December 1902. He graduated from the University of Belgrade's Faculty of Medicine in 1928. In November 1933, he became the first physician in the municipality of Srbac, in northern Bosnia, before continuing his practice in the nearby town of Gradiška. He was a vocal South Slav nationalist throughout the interwar period. Prior to the outbreak of World War II, he was the mayor of Konjic, a town in northern Herzegovina. He was also a member of the pro-Serb and pro-Karađorđević Muslim cultural society known as Gajret, whose members experienced persecution at the hands of non-Serbs in interwar Yugoslavia due to their political inclinations. Popovac is also said to have been a candidate for Vladko Maček's electoral list, but was left without a job in the state government following the creation of the Banovina of Croatia in August 1939.

== World War II ==
The Axis invasion of Yugoslavia was ordered by Adolf Hitler in late March 1941, in response to a palace coup that deposed the country's regent, Prince Paul, and placed his teenaged nephew Peter on the throne. The invasion commenced on 6 April 1941. Yugoslavia was overwhelmed by the combined strength of the Axis powers and surrendered in less than two weeks. The government and royal family went into exile, and the country was occupied and dismembered by its neighbours. The Croatian nationalist and fascist Ante Pavelić, who had been in exile in Benito Mussolini's Italy, was appointed Poglavnik (leader) of an Ustaše-led Croatian state, the Independent State of Croatia (Serbo-Croatian: Nezavisna Država Hrvatska; NDH). The NDH combined almost all of modern-day Croatia, all of modern-day Bosnia and Herzegovina and parts of modern-day Serbia into an "Italian-German quasi-protectorate." With weeks of its establishment, the NDH authorities initiated a campaign of genocide against the Serbs, Jews and Roma living within its borders.

Two resistance movements emerged following the invasion: the communist-led, multi-ethnic Partisans, and the royalist, Serbian nationalist Chetniks, although during 1941, within the occupied territory, even the Partisans consisted almost entirely of Serbs. The Partisans were led by the General Secretary of the Communist Party of Yugoslavia Josip Broz Tito, while the Chetniks were led by Colonel Draža Mihailović, an officer in the interwar Royal Yugoslav Army. The two movements had widely diverging goals. Whereas the Partisans sought to turn Yugoslavia into a communist state under Tito's leadership, the Chetniks sought a return to the pre-war status quo, whereby the Yugoslav monarchy—and, by extension, Serb political hegemony—would be restored.

=== Joining the Chetniks ===
Following the invasion, Popovac joined a Serb rebel band, subsequently swearing allegiance to the Chetniks. According to the historian H. James Burgwyn, Popovac hoped to achieve independence for Bosnia and Herzegovina through his cooperation with the Chetniks. He quickly became one of the most prominent pro-Chetnik Muslims, alongside Mustafa Pašić and former Sarajevo police chief Fehim Musakadić. Such affiliation was rare, as the Chetniks increasingly considered Muslims their enemies and began committing atrocities against Muslim civilians in the late spring of 1941. Due to these actions, and due to Muslims, especially those in eastern Bosnia, being branded by the Chetniks as "Turks" and "Ustaše cronies," the Chetniks found few Muslim recruits.

On 21 July 1942, Popovac wrote a letter to Mihailović, extolling the merits of recruiting Muslims into the Chetniks' ranks. "Muslims have never as a whole, or via any kind of qualified forum, recognized the Croatian state," Popovac wrote. He proposed that Muslim troops "be gathered in either a joint or a specific Chetnik detachment". Popovac suggested that Mihailović should "adopt a prominent Muslim, who has a good voice and political roots among the people, and give him an appropriate rank as Muslim representative and advisor on all questions that relate to the areas in which Muslims live." This proposal was met with support from pro-Serb, anti-communist Muslim leaders in several towns.

=== Muslim People's Military Organization ===
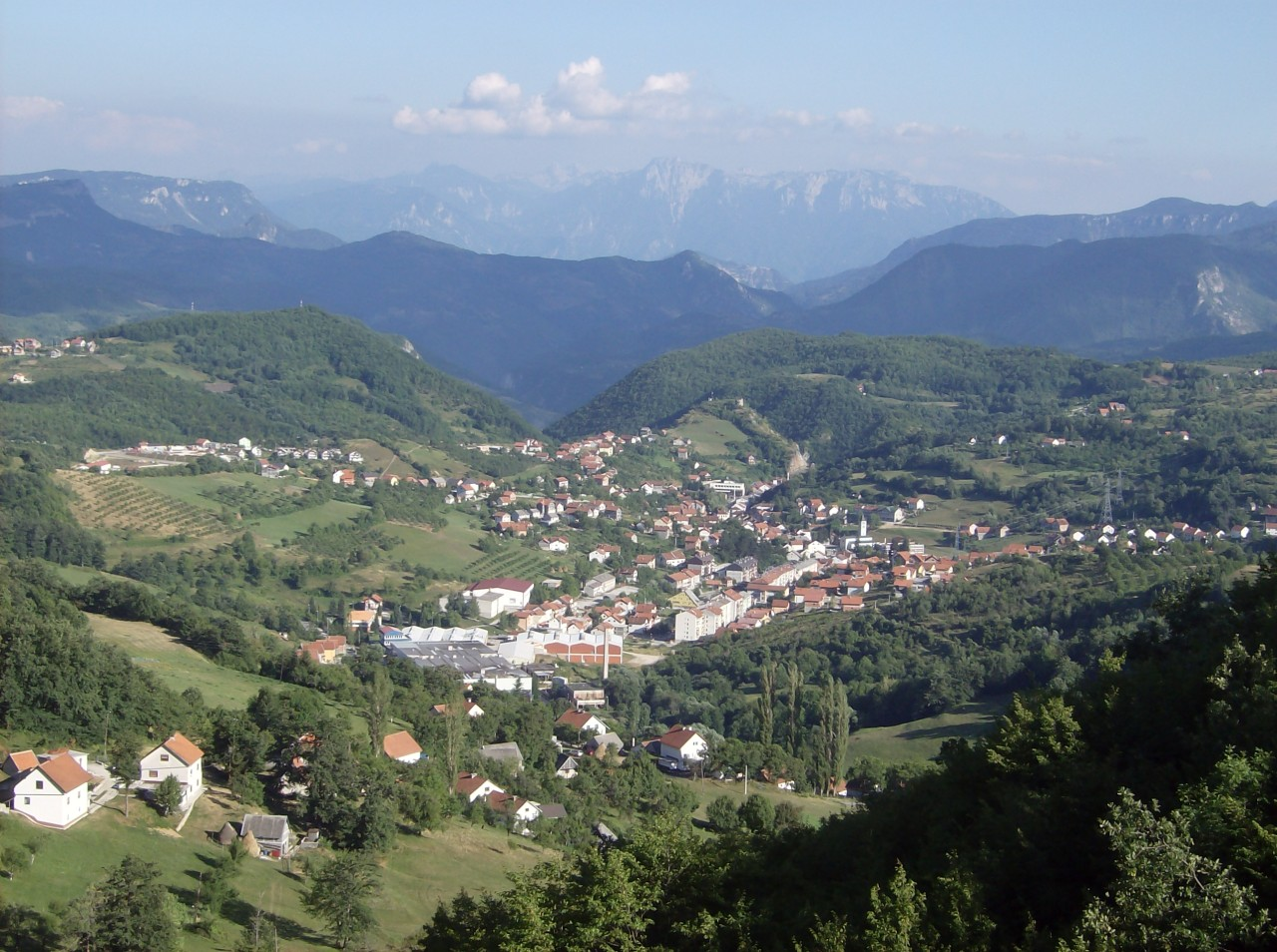
In October 1942, Popovac visited Prozor to discourage further bloodshed following a Chetnik massacre of Muslim and Croat civilians

In late September or early October 1942, Popovac met with Chetnik leaders Dobroslav Jevđević and Petar Baćović. The three agreed to form a Muslim Chetnik militia. In October, Popovac enlisted Italian aid in fighting the Partisans. Popovac's Muslim Chetniks were soon "legalized" by the Italians and listed as part of their Anti-Communist Volunteer Militia (Italian: Milizia Volontaria Anti Comunista; MVAC). Popovac and Pašić became the political leaders of the Muslim Chetniks, whose militia was formally called the Muslim People's Military Organization (Serbo-Croatian: Muslimanska nacionalna vojna organizacija; MNVO). Musakadić was appointed the military leader of all the Muslim Chetniks. Another Muslim, Mustafa Mulalić, became the vice-chairman of the Chetnik's Central National Committee. The creation of the MNVO complied with the Chetniks' strategy of turning the Croats and Muslims of eastern Herzegovina against one another. According to the historian Marko Attila Hoare, the MNVO was part of a greater Muslim autonomist movement. In September 1942, an assembly of Herzegovinian Muslim notables in Mostar declared: "We Herzegovinians and Bosnians are nobody's property and we recognize the right of nobody to persecute us. So, insofar as our brothers in Zagreb do not wish to accede to our demands, we shall seek protection of our interests from other big powers from the ranks of our allies." Vladimir Zečević, one of Mihailović's main agents in Herzegovina, believed that Popovac's "main goal was to protect the Muslims, rather than to struggle for the Serb nation and Serb affairs." Popovac's close connections with the Muslim Chetnik leader Suljaga Salihagić, one of the authors of the Muslim Memorandum to Adolf Hitler in December 1942, appear to support this assertion.

In October 1942, Popovac issued an appeal to Muslim Partisans, urging them to join the Chetniks and turn against the Ustaše. In a report to Mihailović dated 3 November, Popovac wrote:

I have to emphasize to you the intimate cooperation between the Muslims and Orthodox in the Stolac district from where, through the joint struggle of the Muslims and Orthodox, the Croat inhabitants, who were largely Ustaša-inclined, have been expelled. In that way, from Gabela to Mostar the entire left bank of the Neretva has been cleansed, and the number of refugees has been estimated at 12,000 people.

It was reported that Popovac had "won the majority of the Muslims to his purpose" in the Mostar, Konjic, Nevesinje and Gacko districts. Eventually, he came to be seen as one of "the principal representatives of the pro-Chetnik Muslim current" in Bosnia. In October 1942, during Operation Alfa, a joint Chetnik–Italian attack against the Partisans, the Chetniks killed between 543 and 2,500 Bosnian Muslim and Croat civilians in Prozor. Several days later, Popovac arrived in the town to console the Muslim population and urge the Chetniks there against committing further atrocities. He also attempted to recruit new Chetnik fighters from among the local Muslim population, but was unsuccessful due to the extent of Chetnik atrocities against them. On 31 December, in the face of widespread Muslim opposition, Popovac and his MNVO drafted a resolution vowing allegiance to Yugoslavia's exiled King Peter and to Mihailović, claiming Bosnian Muslims as "an integral part of Serbdom" and the MNVO as "part of the Chetnik movement led by Draža Mihailović, Minister of the Army, Navy and Air Forces."

In January 1943, Popovac led the MNVO in an attack which resulted in the capture of a communist village predominantly inhabited by Muslims. That same month, the Chetniks carried out a number of massacre against the Muslims, especially in Eastern Bosnia, in the areas of Koraj, Bijeljina, Srebrenica, Višegrad, Foča, Goražde, and Vlasenica. Between January and March 1943, Popovac's Chetniks fought the Partisans as part of the Axis-led military operation known as Operation Weiss, but did not distinguish themselves. During the operation itself, the Chetniks committed further atrocities against the Muslims. Nonetheless, Popovac and Pašić continued seeking Muslim recruits. They declared in their "Address to the Brethren Muslims of Čajniče and Other Nearby Districts" that the main goal of the Chetniks was "the intelligent and honest protection of Muslim interests". The Chetniks, they claimed, would "secure a safe future for our people with the highest principles of Islam: freedom of religion, holiness of the family, respect for private property, social justice, and democratic political freedom." They denied that Muslims were collectively responsible for Ustaše crimes, writing: "Muslims are bound to the brethren of the Orthodox religion by blood and land."

=== Demise ===
Popovac was killed on 21 August 1943. The exact circumstances of his death are disputed. Hoare states that Popovac was killed by members of the Partisan 10th Herzegovinan Brigade. The historian and economist Jozo Tomasevich writes that Popovac was killed by an assassin. The historians Zdravko Dizdar and Mihael Sobolevski claim that he was killed by the Chetniks in the vicinity of Trebinje after objecting to the killing of Muslims.

By December 1943, it is estimated that 4,000 of Mihailović's Chetniks were Muslims, accounting for eight percent of all Chetniks in Bosnia and Herzegovina. In his 1944 New Year's Eve address, Mihailović appealed to Muslims to fight against the communists, citing the example of Popovac and other Muslim Chetniks.
