= Fehim Musakadić =

Serbian military officer (died 1943)

Fehim Musakadić (Serbian Cyrillic: Фехим Мусакадић; fl. ?–d. 1943), nom de guerre Musa (Муса), was a Serbian military officer in World War I, Yugoslav reserve major, Sarajevo chief-of-police, and Chetnik commander in World War II. A Muslim from Herzegovina, he espoused a Serb ethnic identity.

Musakadić was born in Sarajevo. He had a brother, Edhem. Musakadić was a member of pro-Serb Muslim organization Gajret.

Muslims joined the Serbian army in World War I, the majority espousing a Serb identity. Musakadić had deserted the Austro-Hungarian army and joined the Serbian army during the Serbian Campaign of World War I. Among notable Muslim soldiers in the Serbian army were Avdo Hasanbegović, Šukrija Kurtović, Ibrahim Hadžiomerović, Fehim Musakadić, Hamid Kukić, Rešid Kurtagić, who all fought as Serbian volunteer officers at the Salonica front. Musakadić was among the most active in the group of Muslims who were engaged in Yugoslav propaganda on Austro-Hungarian Muslim POWs. He was decorated with the Order of the Star of Karađorđe with Swords and was ranked a Yugoslav army reserve major.

Prior to World War II, Musakadić was the Sarajevo chief-of-police. During World War II, few Bosnian Muslims joined the Chetniks. Musakadić joined the Chetniks immediately after the war broke out, and was sent by Chetnik general Draža Mihailović to Eastern Bosnia, joining the staff of Petar Baćović. He established the Konjic Muslim Chetnik Battalion. The Muslim Chetnik leaders were Ismet Popovac, Mustafa Pašić, and Musakadić. General Mihailović appointed Musakadić the commander of all Muslim Chetniks in Yugoslavia on 25 March 1943. During the war he was the organizer of Herzegovinian Muslim Chetniks. He was a favourite of Mihailović. He was captured in the summer of 1943 by the Yugoslav Partisans and executed. The village inhabitants of Obalj had informed the Partisans of their whereabouts, who then captured Musakadić and Joca Pantić without struggle.
