= Avdo Sumbul =

Serb Muslim editor and activist

Abdulah Sumbul
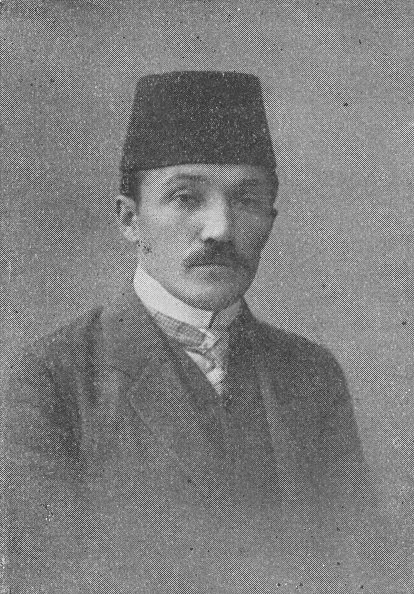
- Born: 27 April 1884
- Died: 8 February 1915 (aged 30); Arad, Austria-Hungary (modern-day Romania)
- Resting place: Ali Pasha Mosque (Sarajevo); 43°51′28.5″N 18°24′45.5″E
- Citizenship: Ottoman Empire, Austria-Hungary
- Occupation: publisher
- Years active: 1912—1915
- Organization(s): Gajret, Muslim Sokol movement in Sarajevo
- Movement: Young Bosnia
- Father: Salih Sumbul

Abdulah "Avdo" Sumbul (27 April 1884 — 8 February 1915) was a Bosnian Muslim editor and political activist associated with Young Bosnia literature journal editor and national activist in Austrian annexed Bosnia and Herzegovina. Sumbul belonged to a group who were targeted as enemies by Austria Hungary and persecuted because of their ethnicity. He died in Austro-Hungarian concentration camp in Arad.

== Biography ==
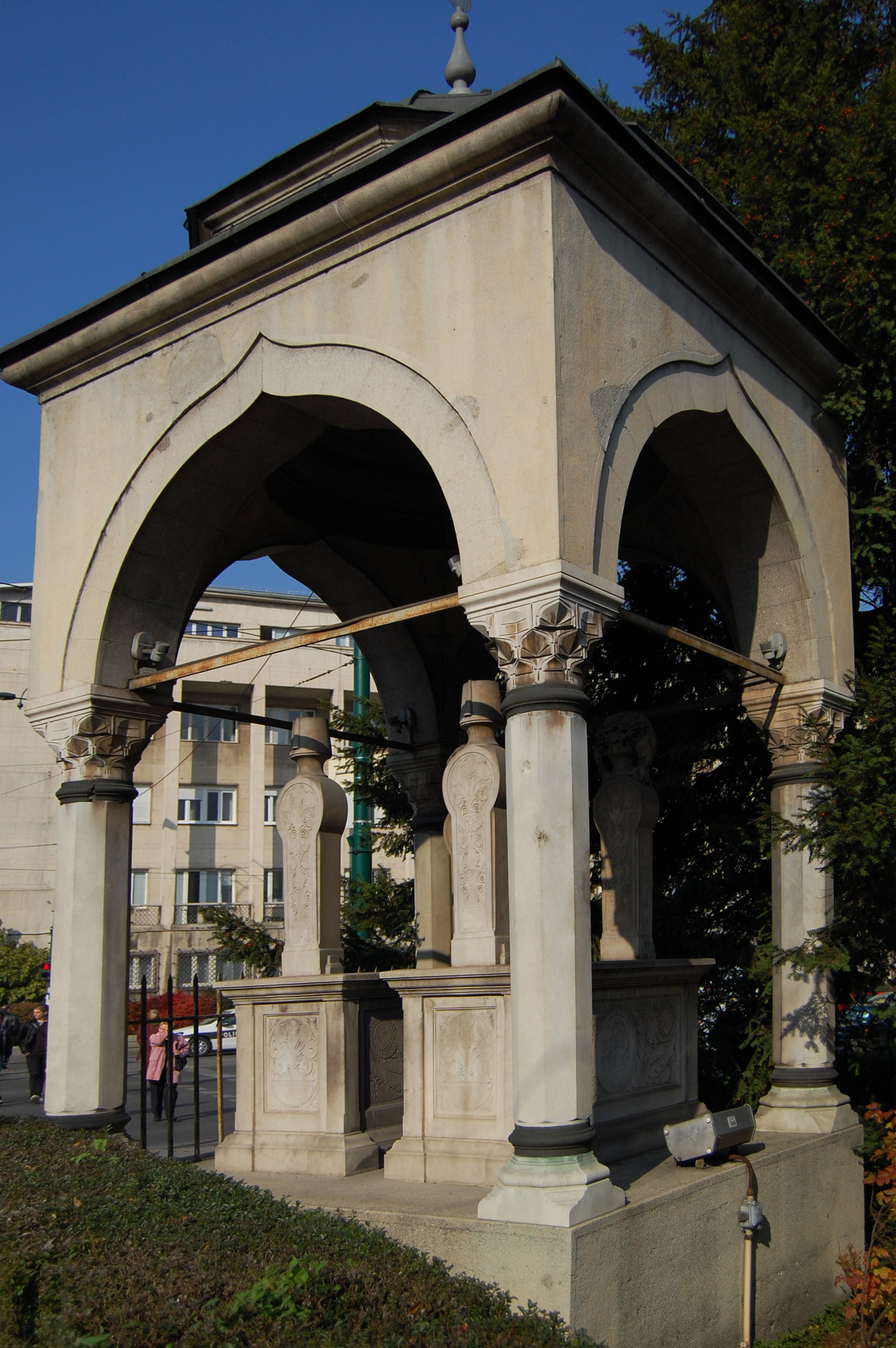
Türbe of Avdo Sumbul and Behdžet Mutevelić in Sarajevo

Sumbul and his family that included his sister, for certain period of time lived in the Sarajevo suburb known as Kovači.

Sumbul was one of the founders of Muslim Sokol movement in Sarajevo. He was member of Young Bosnia. In 1912, after the death of Osman Đikić, the editing of Gajret was entrusted to Avdo Sumbul. In 1914 he was one of the editors of the magazine Vakat, published in Sarajevo.

Vladimir Ćorović emphasize that government of Austria-Hungary perceived and treated Muslims who self-declared themselves as Serbs as enemies of the interest of their state and organized their systematic persecution. Because of his anti-Austrian and pro-Serbian activities, Sumbul was interned to concentration camp in Arad. where he soon died.

== Legacy ==
Sumbul's remains were transferred to Sarajevo where his grave is today, in the courtyard of Ali Pasha Mosque. In 1934, based on the order of Yugoslav king Alexander I of Yugoslavia, a turbe mausoleum was built in honor of Avdo Sumbul and Behdžed Mutevelić. This mausoleums are part of symbolic unity with Chapel of Vidovdan's martyrs on Koševo Christian Orthodox cemetery.

A street in Sarajevo bears Sumbul's name in his honor.

== Sources ==
- Ćorović, Vladimir (1939). Političke prilike u Bosni i Hercegovini. Politika.
- Maksimović, Vojislav (1977). Od usta do usta. Veselin Masleša.
- Koštović, Nijazija (1995). Sarajevo između dobrotvorstva i zla. El-Kalem.
- Ekmečić, Milorad (2007). Dugo kretanje između klanja i oranja: Istorija Srba u Novom Veku 1492-1992 (in Serbian). Zavod za udžbenike. ISBN 9788617145147.
- Dedijer, Vladimir (1966). Sarajevo hiljadu devetstso četraneste. Prosveta.
- Avramov, Smilja (1992). Genocid u Jugoslaviji u svetlosti međunarodnog prava. Politika. ISBN 9788676070664.
