= Mehmed Avdić =

Serbian footballer

Personal information
- Full name: Mehmed Avdić
- Date of birth: 14 May 1998 (age 28)
- Place of birth: Novi Pazar, FR Yugoslavia
- Height: 1.78 m (5 ft 10 in)
- Position: Midfielder

Team information
- Current team: Tutin

Youth career
- Pazar Juniors
- 2011–2017: Novi Pazar

Senior career*
Years	Team	Apps	(Gls)
2016–2018	Novi Pazar	24	(1)
2016–2017	→ Jošanica (loan)	13	(2)
2018	Coruxo	1	(0)
2019	Bečej	10	(2)
2019–2020	Radnički Zrenjanin		
2020	Jagodina	5	(0)
2020-2022	Radnički Sombor		
2022	FAP Priboj		
2023-	Tutin		
- * Club domestic league appearances and goals as of 11:10, 1 October 2019 (UTC)

Mehmed "Meša" Avdić (Serbian Cyrillic: Мехмед Авдић; born 14 May 1998) is a Serbian professional footballer who plays as a midfielder for FK Tutin.

== Club career ==
Born in Novi Pazar, Avdić started playing football with local club Pazar Juniors where he stayed until 2011. Later moved to FK Novi Pazar, where he passed all youth categories joining the first team in 2016. Shortly after he signed his first three-year professional contract with the club, Avdić was loaned to Serbian League West side Jošanica on dual registration until the 2016–17 season. Avdić made his senior debut for Novi Pazar in 20 fixture of the 2016–17 season, replacing Bojan Čečarić in 79 minute of the match against Rad, played on 10 December 2016. He started his first SuperLiga match on the field in last fixture match of the regular season against Partizan. After he sued Novi Pazar for unpaid wages, he got the contract termination to the detriment of the club in July 2017.

Avdic signed for Spanish club Coruxo in the summer 2018, but left the club again at the end of the year. After leaving Spain, he signed with OFK Bečej 1918.

In the summer 2019, he joined FK Radnički Zrenjanin.

== Career statistics ==
=== Club ===
As of 31 May 2017

Club	Season	League			Cup		Continental		Other		Total	
Club	Season	Division	Apps	Goals	Apps	Goals	Apps	Goals	Apps	Goals	Apps	Goals
Jošanica (loan)	2016–17	League West	13	2	—		—		—		13	2
Novi Pazar	2016–17	SuperLiga	8	0	0	0	—		—		8	0
Career total			21	2	0	0	—		—		21	2
