= Milan Savić (author) =

Serbian writer, literary critic

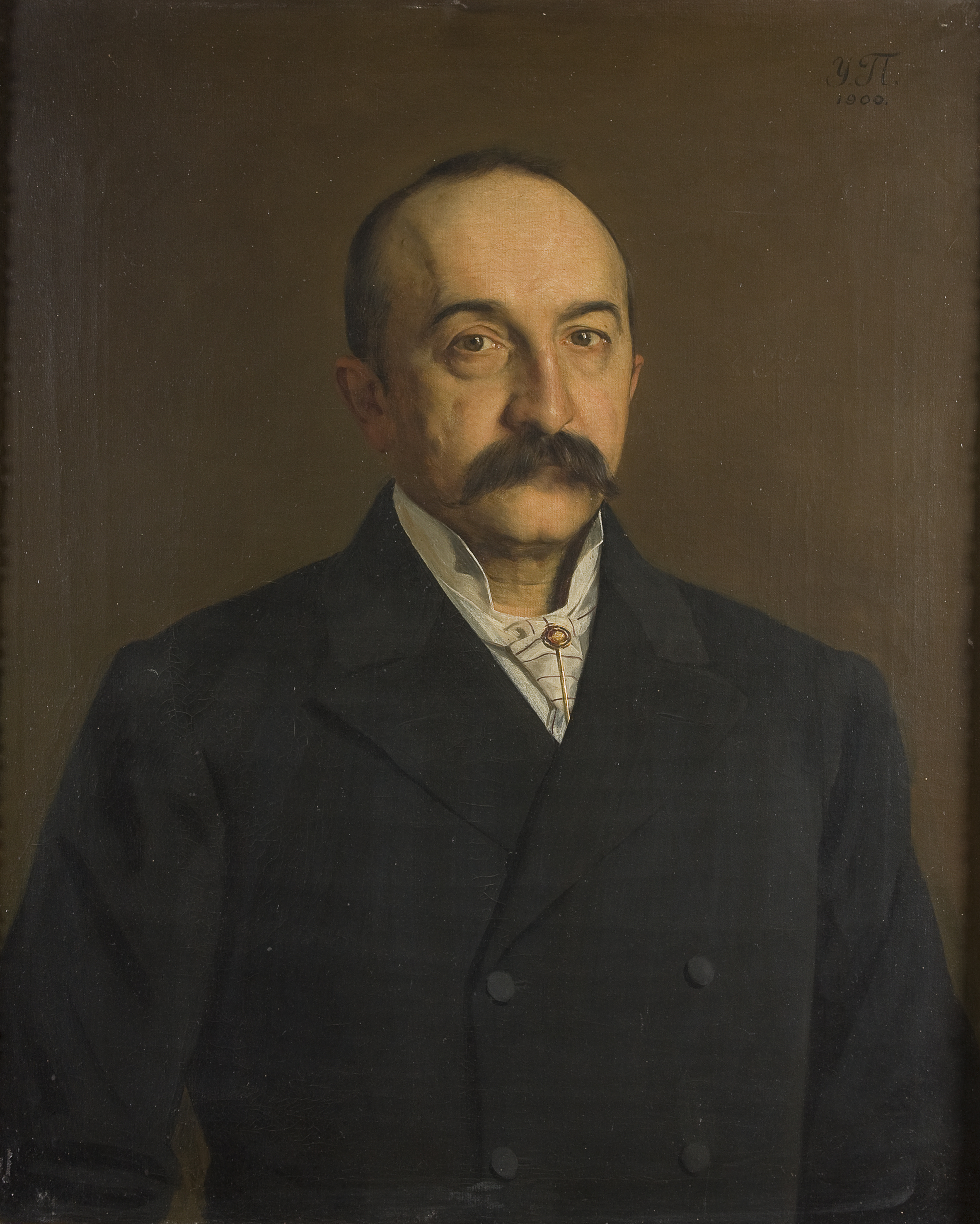
Portrait of Savić by Uroš Predić

Milan Savić (Serbian: Милан Савић German: Emil Szavitz; 1845 – 21 February 1930) was a Serbian polymath: physician writer, historian, philosopher, medical doctor, geographer, literary critic and translator of Goethe's "Faust" in Serbian. Savić was a president of Matica srpska (1896–1911).

== Biography ==
Savić was born in Turska Kanjiža, Austrian Empire. His generation was fighting the Turks for independence, but the cultivators of Serb literature have not been idle either. He was one among the former and the latter. A graduate from the University of Vienna's prestigious School of Medicine in 1867 and philosophy and medicine in Leipzig in 1876 with exceptional Rigorosum honours. In 1876, he obtained the title of Doctor of Philosophy in Leipzig. He lends his services as a medical doctor in the Serbian–Ottoman War (1876–78) and the Serbo-Bulgarian War of 1885. Among the institutions of national culture, the stage had received praiseworthy attention, that classical dramatic work of the West is acted in the Serbian idiom on the stages of Belgrade, Novi Sad, and Kragujevac. Not only Schiller's "Mary Stuart" and "Don Carlos", Shakespeare's "Romeo and Juliet" and "Othello", but Goethe's "Faust" in the Serb theatre of Novi Sad was produced. The translator, in the metre of the original, was from the pen of this Serbian physician and literary critic.

He was the father of Anica Savić Rebac.

== Works ==
- Istorija Bugarskog naroda (Novi Sad, 1878)
- Laza Kostić (1929)
- Iz srpske književnosti: slike I rasprave (1898)
- Razni putevi (1885)
- Iz prošlih dana (1902)
- Udovina (in verse; 1889)
- U Fruškoj gori (1890)

== See also ==
- Laza Lazarević
- Vladan Radoman
