= Rašid Avdić =

Serbia footballer

Personal information
- Full name: Rašid Avdić
- Date of birth: 14 August 1980 (age 46)
- Place of birth: Loznica, SFR Yugoslavia
- Height: 1.83 m (6 ft 0 in)
- Position: Forward

Senior career*
Years	Team	Apps	(Gls)
2001	Mladost Apatin	6	(0)
2002	Radnički Stobex	14	(2)
2002–2004	Loznica	49	(11)
2004–2005	Radnik Bijeljina		
2005	Zrinjski Mostar	13	(5)
2006	Željezničar Sarajevo	22	(5)
2007	Mačva Šabac		
2008	Vardar	0	(0)
2009	Zvijezda Gradačac	2	(0)
2010–2012	Podrinje Janja	1	(0)
- * Club domestic league appearances and goals

Rašid Avdić (Serbian Cyrillic: Рашид Авдић; born 14 August 1980) is a Serbian former footballer who played as a forward.

== Career ==
Avdić played for clubs including FK Mladost Apatin, FK Loznica, FK Radnik Bijeljina, HŠK Zrinjski Mostar, FK Željezničar Sarajevo, FK Mačva Šabac, FK Vardar, NK Zvijezda Gradačac and FK Podrinje Janja. He appeared for Zrinjski in both legs of its 2005–06 UEFA Champions League first qualifying-round tie against Dudelange.

== Personal life ==
Avdić is the father of footballer Adem Avdić.
