= Avdo Karabegović Hasanbegov =

19th-century Bosnian poet

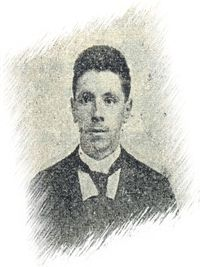
Drawing of Avdo Karabegović Hasanbegov

Avdo Karabegović Hasanbegov (1878–1900) was a Bosnian poet. He was the cousin of the poet S. Avdo Karabegović, who adopted the letter S. as his first initial, which stood for Srbin (Serb), partly to distinguish himself from his cousin. Karabegović secretly taught Hasanbegov the Latin alphabet against the wishes of Hasanbegov's father, who had forbidden him from receiving a Western education. After Hasanbegov began publishing in pro-Serb periodicals in the Latin alphabet, his home was attacked by a mob.

Hasanbegov died in 1900. Writing about Hasanbegov in 1902, the writer and literary critic Svetozar Ćorović remarked: "Many hated him precisely because he called himself a Serb and because he, against all their advice, did not want to reject that name. He hated them for the same reasons."
