= S. Avdo Karabegović =

Bosnian and Serbian poet

S. Avdo Karabegović Авдо Карабеговић
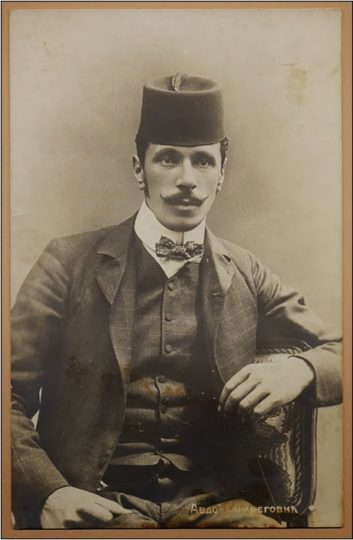
- Born: 25 August 1878; Modriča, Bosnia Vilayet, Ottoman Empire
- Died: 22 December [O.S. 9 December] 1908 (aged 30); Loznica, Kingdom of Serbia
- Resting place: New Cemetery, Belgrade
- Occupation: Poet
- Writing career
- Years active: 1895–1908

Avdo Karabegović (Serbian Cyrillic: Авдо Карабеговић; 25 August 1878 – 22 December [O.S. 9 December] 1908), better known by his pen name S. Avdo Karabegović (Serbian Cyrillic: C. Авдо Карабеговић), was a Bosnian, and later Serbian, poet who was active between 1895 and 1908.

Born to a prominent but impoverished Muslim landowning family in northern Bosnia, Karabegović's poetry was first published when he was seventeen. An ardent Serbophile, he attended school in Constantinople for several years before relocating to Serbia and settling in its capital, Belgrade. In 1900, Karabegović and fellow Muslim Serbophiles Osman Đikić and Omer-beg Sulejmanpašić printed a book of Serbian patriotic poetry. Later that year, upon entering Austria-Hungary on a visit to neighbouring Zemun, Karabegović was arrested for draft evasion by the Austro-Hungarian authorities and forcibly inducted into the Austro-Hungarian Army, where he contracted tuberculosis.

Shortly after being discharged from the Austro-Hungarian Army, Karabegović was stripped of his Austrian citizenship. He subsequently returned to Serbia and completed teachers' college. In 1905, Karabegović published his second and final poetry collection. Later that year, he was hired to teach Muslim schoolchildren in the town of Mali Zvornik, in western Serbia. By 1908, Karabegović's health had deteriorated rapidly, and in November of that year, his friends took him to a hospital in the town of Loznica, where he died the following month. His body was buried at Belgrade's New Cemetery.

== Biography ==
Avdo Karabegović was born into a prominent but impoverished Bosnian Muslim land-owning family in the town of Modriča, in northern Bosnia vilayet of the Ottoman Empire, on 25 August 1878. He was the son of Halim-beg and Fatima Karabegović (née Mustajbegović). The Karabegović clan is believed to have originated from the village of Budim Do, in western Herzegovina. At the beginning of the 18th century, four brothers from the clan left the village and migrated northward, settling in Zenica, Bihać, Mostar and Modriča, respectively. Karabegović personally believed that he was descended from the medieval Crnojević noble family, which ruled the Principality of Zeta in the 15th century.

Karabegović was born at a time when the Ottoman province of Bosnia began to be occupied by Austria-Hungary and was taken away from the Ottoman Empire. Karabegović completed his primary education in Modriča, where he also attended mekteb. He became a published writer at the age of seventeen. His first work, a poem titled Zec (Rabbit), was published in the periodical Bršljan (Ivy) in 1895. His second poem, Srpstvu (To Serbdom), was published in the periodical Bosanska vila (Bosnian Nymph) in 1896. Karabegović adopted the letter S. as his first initial, which stood for Srbin (Serb). This was done, in part, to emphasize his self-identification as a Serb, but also to distinguish himself from his cousin Avdo Karabegović Hasanbegov. Karabegović did not shy away from proselytizing and openly espousing his Serbophile convictions, going so far as to secretly teach the Latin alphabet to Hasanbegov, who had been forbidden from receiving a Western education by his father. After Hasanbegov began publishing pro-Serb periodicals in the Latin alphabet, his home was attacked by a mob.

Karabegović subsequently relocated to the town of Bursa, in Anatolia, where he attended a vocational school. In 1896, he enrolled in a lyceum in Constantinople. In 1898, having completed three years of study, Karabegović dropped out and relocated to Serbia. He settled in Belgrade, which was then home to one of the world's largest Bosnian Muslim diasporas, second only to Constantinople. In 1899, the writer Janko Veselinović's publication Zvezda printed a Serbian patriotic poem that Karabegović had written. In 1900, Karabegović and fellow Muslim Serbophiles Osman Đikić and Omer-beg Sulejmanpašić printed a book of Serbian patriotic poetry. Later that year, after crossing the Austro-Hungarian border to visit Zemun, Karabegović was arrested by the Austro-Hungarian authorities for draft evasion. He was subsequently taken to Budapest, and as a Habsburg subject, compelled to serve three years in the Austro-Hungarian Army. It was during this time that he contracted tuberculosis, which would plague him for the rest of his life.

After being discharged from the Austro-Hungarian Army, Karabegović enrolled in a teachers' college in Pakrac. Due to his pro-Serb and anti-Habsburg convictions, he was soon stripped of his Austrian citizenship. In 1903, Karabegović relocated to Aleksinac, in central Serbia, where he attended teachers' college. He graduated from teachers' college in 1905. The same year, the Royal Serbian Government hired Karabegović to teach Muslim schoolchildren in the town of Mali Zvornik, in western Serbia. Later that year, Karabegović published his second poetry collection, titled simply Pjesme (Poems). By 1908, Karabegović's tuberculosis had worsened substantially. He initially sought treatment in Belgrade before relocating to Ulcinj in the hope that the town's warm climate would ameliorate his symptoms, to no avail. On the advice of his doctors, Karabegović returned to Mali Zvornik. On 20 November [O.S. 7 November], Karabegović's friends took him to a hospital in the town of Loznica, where he died on 18 December [O.S. 5 December], aged 30. His body was transported to Belgrade and buried at the New Cemetery on 22 December [O.S. 9 December]. The playwright Branislav Nušić subsequently delivered a eulogy from the balcony of Belgrade's National Theatre in Karabegović's honour.

== Legacy ==
More than one hundred of Karabegović's poems were published during his lifetime. In 1931, a street in Sarajevo was named after him. The street was renamed in 1993, during the Bosnian War, on account of Karabegović's self-identification as a Serb and his association with Serbian literature. A street in the Serbian town of Šabac is named after Karabegović. In 2019, local officials considered renaming the street after folk singer Šaban Šaulić, but decided against it after a public outcry.

== List of works ==
Source: Šašić (1998, p. 145)

- 1900 Pobratimstvo (Brotherhood), with Osman Đikić and Omer-beg Sulejmanpašić, Belgrade (poetry anthology)
- 1905 Pjesme (Poems), Belgrade (poetry anthology)
