= Osman Đikić =

19th & 20th century poet and dramatist

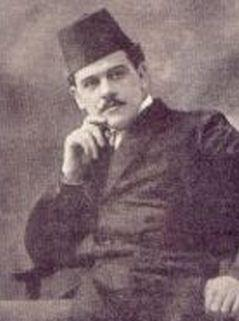
- Born: 7 January 1879; Mostar, Bosnia and Herzegovina, Ottoman Empire
- Died: 30 March 1912 (aged 33); Mostar, Condominium of Bosnia and Herzegovina, Austria-Hungary
- Occupation: Poet
- Spouse: Zora Topalović (m. 1905–12; his death)
- Writing career
- Literary movement: Romanticism

Osman Đikić (Serbian Cyrillic: Осман Ђикић; 7 January 1879 – 30 March 1912) was a Bosnian and Serbian poet, dramatist and writer from Bosnia. He was born in Mostar, in Bosnia and Herzegovina under Austro-Hungarian occupation. He was educated in Belgrade, Constantinople and Vienna, where he graduated from the Trade Academy. He is penned several sevdalinka songs, including Đaurko mila, Ašik ostah na te oči and Đela Fato đela zlato.

== Biography ==
Osman Đikić was born in Mostar on 7 January 1879, into a respected middle-class Serbian Muslim family of father Ahmed Đikić (1858–1918) and mother Hana (née Kurt; died 1908). He successfully completed primary school in Mostar, as well as five years of secondary schooling at Mostar Gymnasium before being expelled for publicly supporting Serbian nationalism. He relocated to Belgrade, Serbia to finish his education, only to relocate once more to Istanbul, where he completed secondary schooling. He later attended and graduated from the New Vienna Commercial Academy in Vienna.

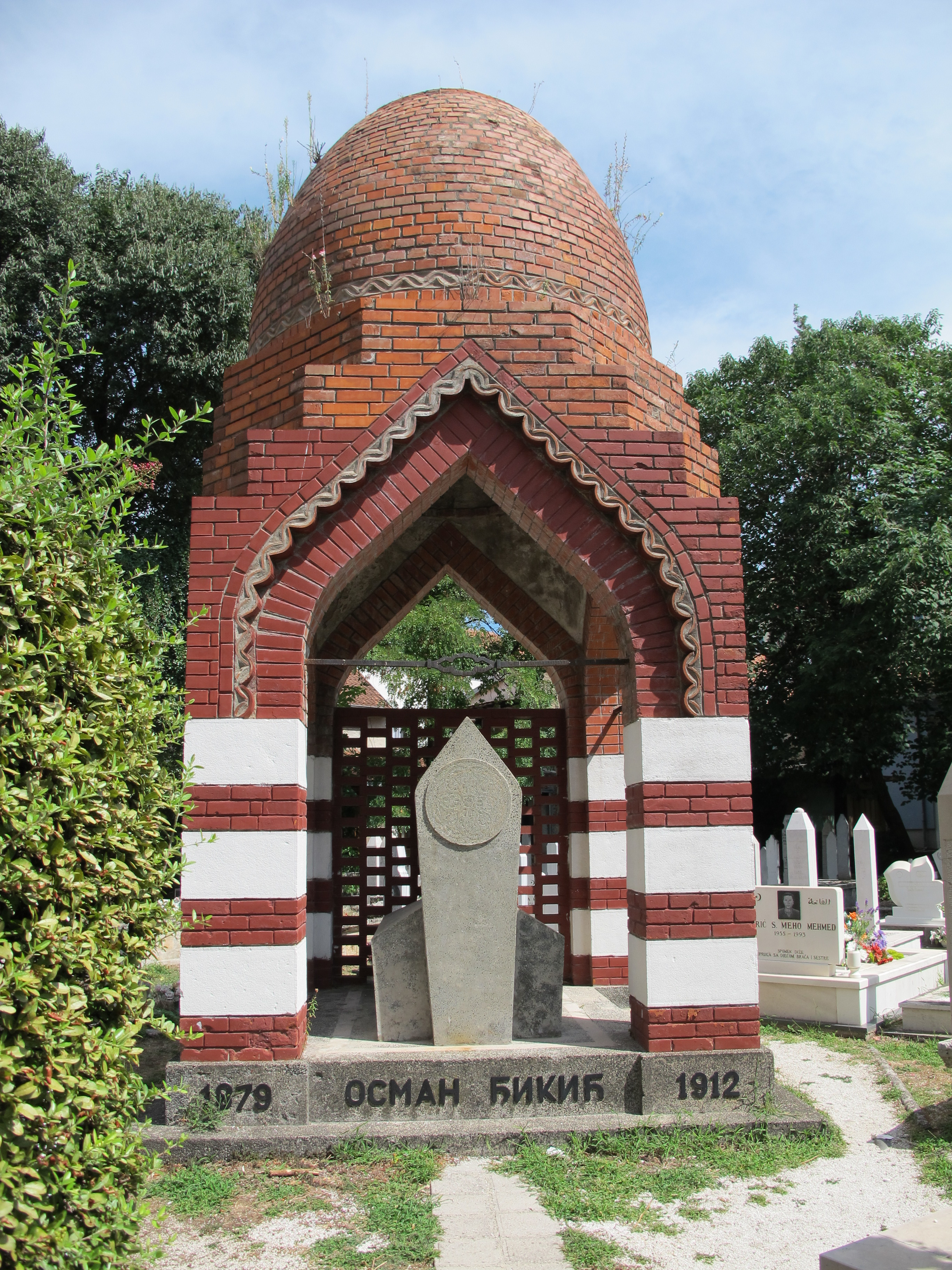
Grave of Osman Đikić in Mostar

Osman Đikić married Serbian actress Zora Topalović (or Mihailović) in Vienna in 1905. He was educated in Belgrade, Constantinople and Vienna, where he graduated from the Trade Academy.

Following graduation, Đikić served as a bank teller in Zagreb, Brčko and Mostar. He later served as the editor of the Mostar-based newspaper Musavat (Unity) in 1907, as well as published pieces in the Bosansko-hercegovački glasnik (Bosnian-Herzegovinian Herald).

=== Writing activity ===
Osman Đikić is a renowned Bosnian and Herzegovinian poet and dramatist, who established himself as part of literary creation of Muslim writers in Bosnia and Herzegovina during the Austro-Hungarian rule. His poetry tended to be didactic, with elements of love, patriotism and religion serving as central themes. He first published his poems in Bosnian newspapers such as Behar ("Blossom"), Bosanska vila ("Bosnian fairy") and Zora ("Dawn"). One of his first compilation of poems was published in 1900 alongside poems from Omer-beg Sulejmanpašić Skopljak and Avdo Karabegović in Belgrade. This compilation was known as Pobratimstvo ("Alliance") and was a collection of patriotic poetry. This compilation was not well received by Bosnian author Osman Nuri Hadžić, who heavily criticised the work in Behar. Hadžić's critique barred Đikić from further publishing his literary works within Behar.

Đikić later independently published two poem compilations: Muslimanskoj mladeži ("To the Muslim Youth") in Dubrovnik in 1902 and Ašiklije (Lovers) in Mostar in 1903.

As a folklorist, Đikić collected traditional folk songs from Mostar and neighbouring Stolac. He later compiled these folk songs into a 5,000-verse compilation known as Hercegovački biser ("Herzegovinian Pearl") and gave it to the Serbian Royal Academy.

As a dramatist, Đikić wrote three dramas: Zlatija, which was published in 1906; Stana, which was published in either 1906 or 1907; and Muhadžir ("Immigrant" or "Refugee"), which was published in either 1908 or 1909.

=== Political activity ===
Following Bosnia and Herzegovina's occupation by Austria-Hungary from the Ottoman Empire, Austria-Hungary attempted to eradicate all ethnic nationalism by promoting a pluralist nation within Bosnia and Herzegovina. However, this policy was not widely accepted by the three major ethnic groups of the nation - Bosniaks, Croats and Serbs, who each sought to promote their own nationalist aspirations. Contemporary Bosnians were plunged into this political atmosphere, including Đikić. Đikić relocated to Sarajevo in 1909, secretly joining the Muslim National Organisation (MNO). Earlier, the MNO took over Gajret, a culturo-educational society co-established by Safvet-beg Bašagić. Gajret was the only contemporary organisation in Sarajevo that assisted impoverished Muslim students. MNO established a political paper wing of Gajret in 1907. In 1909, MNO installed Đikić as the secretary of Gajret, as well as its magazine's editor.

Đikić adopted a profound feelings for Serbian nationalism and became a proponent of a unified South-Slavonic state (Yugoslavia). He advocated cooperation between Bosnian Muslims and Bosnian Orthodox Christians. He launched a political magazine entitled Samouprava ("Autonomy") in 1910, where he served as the editor-in-chief.

=== Death ===
Đikić died due to tuberculosis on 30 March 1912 at the age of 33. His remains were interred at the Grand Harem cemetery in the Carina neighbourhood (mahala) of Mostar. His wife, Zora, also died from tuberculosis shortly afterward, on 14 September 1912. In 1936, Belgrade-based architect, Aleksandar Deroko, designed and constructed a brick türbe (mausoleum) in pseudo-Moorish architecture for Đikić's remains. However, the newly constructed türbe was located within the Small Harem beside the Karagöz Bey Mosque in Mostar. Đikić's remains were, therefore, subsequently transferred to the türbe upon completion, where a sarcophagus was constructed above his grave. During World War II, the Ustaše destroyed the türbe, but it was later reconstructed following the war. The türbe also later suffered damage during the Bosnian War. In 1993, paramilitary Croat forces, known as the Croatian Defence Forces, blasted the türbe. The resulting explosion caused the destruction of the sarcophagus, while the türbe itself only suffered partial damage. Extensive repairs were conducted on the türbe following the war and was fully restored.

== Legacy ==
The Yugoslav government helped establish a cultural organization, Osman-Đikić-Gajret, independent from the Gajret, in 1923, and at the same time founded a student house with the same name for Bosnian Muslims in Belgrade.

== Works ==
Poetry compilations

- Pobratimstvo, 1900
- Muslimanskoj mladeži, 1902
- Ašiklije, 1903

Dramas

- Zlatija, 1906
- Stana, 1906
- Muhadžir, 1909

== Sources ==
- Enes Duraković (1998). "Osman Đikić". Bošnjačka književnost u književnoj kritici: Novija književnost - poezija. Alef. pp. 116–119. ISBN 9789958699009.
