= Dolac, Travnik =

Dolac
- Village
- Location within Bosnia and Herzegovina
- Coordinates: 44.219165°N 17.770392°E
- Country: Bosnia and Herzegovina
- Entity: Federation of Bosnia and Herzegovina
- Canton: Central Bosnia
- Municipality: Travnik

Area
  - Total: 0.93 sq mi (2.40 km^{2})
- Elevation: 2,507 ft (764 m)

Population (2013)
  - Total: 480
  - Density: 520/sq mi (200/km^{2})
- Time zone: UTC+1 (CET)
  - Summer (DST): UTC+2 (CEST)

Dolac is a village in the municipality of Travnik, Bosnia and Herzegovina.

== Demographics ==
According to the 2013 census, its population was 480.

Ethnicity in 2013
Ethnicity	Number	Percentage
Bosniaks	457	93.5%
Croats	19	1.3%
Serbs	1	0.1%
other/undeclared	3	5.0%
Total	480	100%

== Notable people ==
- Tugomir Alaupović, poet and politician
- Ivo Andrić, writer and the 1961 winner of the Nobel Prize for literature
- Zlata Bartl, scientist and creator of Vegeta
