= Bosnian Chronicle =

Historical novel by the writer Ivo Andrić

- Author: Ivo Andrić
- Original title: Travnička hronika
- Language: Serbian
- Genre: Historical fiction

Bosnian Chronicle is a historical novel by Ivo Andrić. It takes place in 1807-1814. The subtitle of the novel is Consular times, referring to the life of consuls in Ottoman Bosnia.

== Plot summary ==
The novel follows the stay of the French and Austrian consuls in Bosnian town of Travnik between 1807 and 1814, during a time of complex political relations between the Ottoman Empire, France, and Austria. The story centers on the French consul Jean Daville, who comes from civilized Europe to the closed and harsh world of the Bosnian town. He meets the Turkish vizier Mehmed Pasha, with whom he develops a friendly relationship, and the translator d'Avenat, whom he views with distrust.

With the arrival of the Austrian consul von Mitterer, the relationship between the two diplomats reflects political changes in Europe - from rivalry to mutual understanding. After Mitterer's departure, his successor, the sober and cold consul von Paulich, introduces a new tone to diplomatic relations. His rationality and distance cause discomfort in both Daville and other characters, especially in the former interpreter Rota, who is eventually exiled.

The novel depicts political and personal tensions, family tragedies, wartime conditions, and cultural differences between East and West. As Napoleon's power declines and France loses influence, the French consulate in Travnik closes. Daville leaves the city, and the people of Travnik, although initially distrustful, realize that the presence of foreign consuls has not brought about what they feared most. The novel begins and ends in Lutva's Coffe, a coffee house where the Travnik beys gathered and commented on historical events.

== Reception ==
According to some critics, Bosnian Chronicle is a better novel than The Bridge on the Drina. Krešimir Nemec states that in the novel, the characters are identified by four identification ideologues, namely: cultural and civilizational affinity, the heterogeneity of Bosnia, division within the same group, and hybrid identities, i.e. characters without cultural identity. Michael Martens states that Andrić gathered most of the material for the novel during visits to archives in Paris and Vienna. He states that the real role model for Jean Daville is Pierre David, a journalist, writer and diplomat from the Calvados area, who is imagined in the novel as a seemingly somewhat lost diplomat, who struggles with life's adversities in Travnik, and as one of Andrić's rare protagonists, he is also in a marriage that we could call harmonious.
