= Tugomir Alaupović =

Yugoslav politician and educator

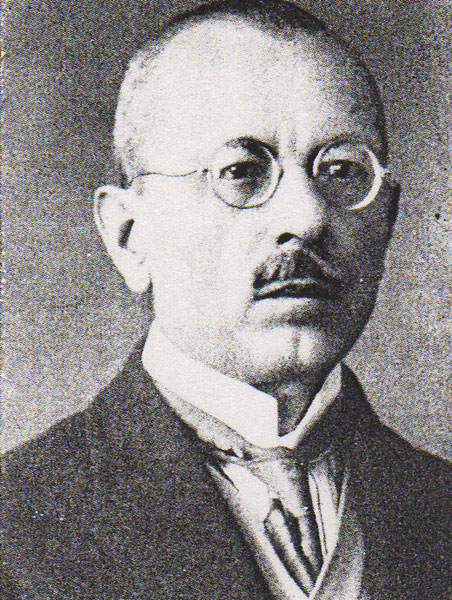
- Alaupović, 1940
- Born: 18 August 1870; Dolac, Bosnia Vilayet, Ottoman Empire (now Dolac, Bosnia and Herzegovina)
- Died: 9 April 1958 (aged 87); Zagreb, SFR Yugoslavia (now Zagreb, Croatia)

Tugomir Marko Alaupović (18 August 1870 – 9 April 1958) was a Yugoslav educator, poet, and politician, serving as Minister of Religion in the government of the Kingdom of Serbs, Croats, and Slovenes.

He wrote several literary works that have been translated into French, German, Czech, and Italian. He was one of the initiators of the Croatian Society for the "Setting up of Children in Crafts and Trade" in Sarajevo and later initiated the change of the society name to Napredak. He was a member of the Main Board of the Serbian St. Sava Society in Belgrade. On 16 January 1934, after a serious operation, in a letter to Tihomir Đorđević, a prominent Serbian ethnologist, he said:

Unfortunately, my hopes have not been fulfilled and I will have to stay long or maybe even definitely in Zagreb. It hurts and I'm sorry that for these reasons, I have to resign as a member of the Main Board of the St. Sava Society. But rest assured that for the rest of my life, I will remain faithful to that beautiful and noble saying: "Everyone is my dear brother be he any religion".

== Early life ==
Descended from a Bosnian noble family, Alaupović was born in Dolac near Travnik in modern-day Bosnia and Herzegovina in 1870. He lost his father early and was raised by his mother, Ivka (née Abramović-Klinčić). During his childhood, he attended school with the Franciscans, but due to illness, he was not able to regularly attend. He attended gymnasium first in Travnik before attending the classical gymnasium in Sarajevo. He ultimately graduated in Zagreb in 1890.

After completing gymnasium, he studied Slavistics and classical philology at the University of Zagreb before furthering his studies in Vienna in 1891. There, received his doctorate in October 1894 from Vatroslav Jagić after he successfully defended his dissertation, entitled "Vila Slovinka — by Juraj Baraković, with Special Reference to Hell in the Twelfth Canto" (Bosnian: Vila Slovinka — od Jurja Barakovića, s osobitim osvrtom na pakao u XII pjevanju).

== Career ==
In 1894, Alaupović began teaching as a substitute at the classical gymnasium in Sarajevo, teaching Croatian, Latin, Greek, and philosophy until 1910. Once he had passed his professorial examination, he also began teaching at the Sarajevo Technical School. There, he became friends with Fra Grgo Martić and Silvije Strahimir Kranjčević.

In 1910, he became the principal at the Tuzla Gymnasium before moving on to work as an advisor to the Ministry of Education and supervisor for secondary schooling throughout the Austrian-ruled Condominium of Bosnia and Herzegovina. In 1915, due to his Yugoslavist beliefs, he was relieved of duty and tried for high treason. He was released, but in 1916, he was forced to retire and interned at a Franciscan monastery in Sarajevo. At the end of 1917, he returned to Zagreb and from mid-1918 until the end of World War I, worked as the secretary of Matica hrvatska.

The same year, he became a member of the People's Council of the State of Bosnia and Herzegovina in Sarajevo, a commissioner for education and worship, and was reactivated by a decree of the People's Government for Bosnia and Herzegovina. From then until 1920, he served as the Minister of Religion during the first government of the Kingdom of Serbs, Croats, and Slovenes in Belgrade, before becoming head of the commission for education and temporary provincial governor for Croatia-Slavonia. In 1922, he was again forced into retirement by decree before being deactivated again, becoming vice president of the State Council and board member for the Democratic Party.

In 1929, Alaupović retired of his own volition, although he continued to be involved as a board member for the Democratic Party in Belgrade until he left for Zagreb in 1931. He lived there until he died on 9 April 1958.
