= Nikola Moravčević =

Serbian-American writer

Nikola Moravčević (Serbian Cyrillic: Никола Моравчевић, also rendered as Nicholas Moravcevich, born December 10, 1935) is a Serbian-American literary historian, literary critic, academic and novelist. Born and educated in Yugoslavia, he moved to the United States in 1955, and made an academic career, chiefly at the University of Illinois at Chicago, in the field of Slavic Studies and literary history. Since 1990s, he published several historical novels in Serbian and English. He lives in Chicago.

== Biography ==
Moravčević was born in Zagreb, (Kingdom of Yugoslavia) in a family of Serbian officer of Yugoslav Royal Army on December 10, 1935. During the World War II, his father was captured and held prisoner by the Germans but refused to return to the communist Yugoslavia after the war ended.

After he completed undergraduate studies at the Faculty of Dramatic Arts at the University of Belgrade in 1955, Moravčević moved to the United States. After three years of service in the U.S. Army, he obtained in 1961 a magisterial degree in Theatrical Directing from the School of Theatre Arts at the Art Institute of Chicago, and in 1964 a doctoral degree in Comparative Literature from the University of Wisconsin–Madison.

He subsequently taught at Stevens College in Missouri as an assistant professor (1964–66) and at the University of Illinois at Chicago as an assistant professor (1966–68), an associate professor (1968–71) and full professor (1971–2002). At UIC he also held several administrative positions. In 1968, he founded the Slavic Department and served as its head for thirteen years (until 1981). From 1981 to 1988, he served as the university's vice-chancellor and director of campus development.

His scholarly work includes over two hundred essays and critical reviews in the spheres of Russian, French and Serbian literature, published in various collections of essays, several leading encyclopedias and a wide array of scholarly journals in the United States and Canada. The periodicals which have most of his scholarly contributions are: Comparative Literature, Slavic and East European Journal, Drama Critique, Canadian Slavonic Papers, Drama Survey, Comparative Drama, Russian Literature, L'Europe du Sud-Est, Comparative Literature Studies, Russian Language Journal, Bucknell Review, The New Review, Journal of Baltic Studies, Books Abroad-World Literature Today, The South Slav Journal, Serbian Studies and Slavic Review.

His first notable creative literary endeavor is a historical novel Albion, Albion, published in Belgrade, Serbia, in the fall of 1994. This work was chosen as one of the ten best novels written in Serbian language during that year, and remained on the list of national best-sellers throughout 1995. Moravčević also received, in the summer of 1998, the Rastko Petrović Literary Award for the best Serbian novel written in the diaspora. The novel was reprinted in 1998 by the publishing house Slobodan Mašić, and in 2006 by Stubovi kulture. In 2009 publishing house "Arhipelag" from Belgrade published the English version of this novel.

Dr. Moravčević is a member of several American and international scholarly associations and an honorary Doctor of Letters at the Wrocław University in Poland (1980). From 1980 to 1994, he served as the chief editor of Serbian Studies, the only scholarly journal in America dedicated to the Serbian culture. Since 1990, professor Moravčević has been a member of the Crown Council of the Serbian Crown Prince Aleksandar Karađorđević and is a bearer of the Serbian decoration of White Eagle with the great cross (first degree), the Lithuanian decoration of Diplomatic Star and Serbian decoration of Karadjordje star (third degree).

He is married to Dr. Jelena Banković and they live in Chicago.

== Works ==
=== Historical novels ===
- Albion, Albion (1994), Slobodan Mašić, Belgrade. Second edition: (2006) Stubovi kulture, Belgrade. Third edition: (2009) Arhipelag, Belgrade.
- ’’Albion, Albion’’ (2009), Archipelag, Belgrade [in English].
- Svetlost zapada – Lux Occidentalis(Light of The West – Lux Occidentalis), (2003) Prosveta, Belgrade. Second edition: (2008) Arhipelag, Belgrade.
- Vitez u doba zla (Knight in the Time of Evil) (2007), Arhipelag, Belgrade. Second edition: (2010) Arhipelag, Belgrade.
- A Brandenburg Concerto, (2008), Arhipelag, Belgrade [in English].
- Brandenburški končerto, (Serbian translation) (2009), Arhipelag, Belgrade.
- Vreme vaskrsa (A Time of Resurrection) (2009), Arhipelag, Belgrade.
- Beču na veru (Trusting Vienna) (2010), Arhipelag, Belgrade.
- Poslednji despot (The Last Despot), (2011), Arhipelag, Belgrade.
- Radičevo zaveštanje (The Legacy of Radič) (2012), Arhipelag, Belgrade.
- Zapisi o srpskom carstvu (The Notes about the Serbian Empire), (2014), Arhipelag, Belgrade.
- Grof Sava Vladislavić (Count Sava Vladislavić), (2015), Arhipelag, Belgrade. This novel received in 2016. literary award Janko Veselinović from the Serbian Writers Association for the best historical novel in 2015. (Russian translation) (2017) Aleteja, Sankt Peterburg.
- Marko Mrnjavčević - Nepriznati srpski kralj (Marko Mrnjavčević - Unrecognised Serbian king) (2016), Arhipelag, Belgrade.
- Braća Anđelovići (Brothers Andjelović) (2017), Arhipelag, Belgrade.
- Ilona strašna (Ilona the terrible) (2018), Arhipelag, Belgrade.
- Aleksandar II Karađorđević - Prilozi za biografiju(Aleksandar II Karađorđević - Contribution to a biography)(2018), Čigoja, Belgrade.
- Nesrećni Kralj: Strana sužanjstva kralja Stefana Uroša III Dečanskog (Unfortunate King: Foreign captivities of king Stefan Uroš III Dečanski), (2019), Arhipelag, Belgrade.
- Knez Lazar Hrebeljanović kao istorijska ličnost (Prince Lazar Hrebeljanović as a historical figure), (2021), Arhipelag, Belgrade.
- Nikola Pasic (Nikola Pasic), (2022), Arhipelag, Belgrade.

=== Essays ===
- Selected Essays on Serbian and Russian Literatures and History (2005) [In English], Stubovi kulture, Belgrade

== Historical study ==
- "Srpske vlastelinke, drzavnice i diplomatkinje krajem XIV i prvom polovinom XV veka" (2016), Arhipelag, Belgrade.
