= Ovčarevo =

- Village
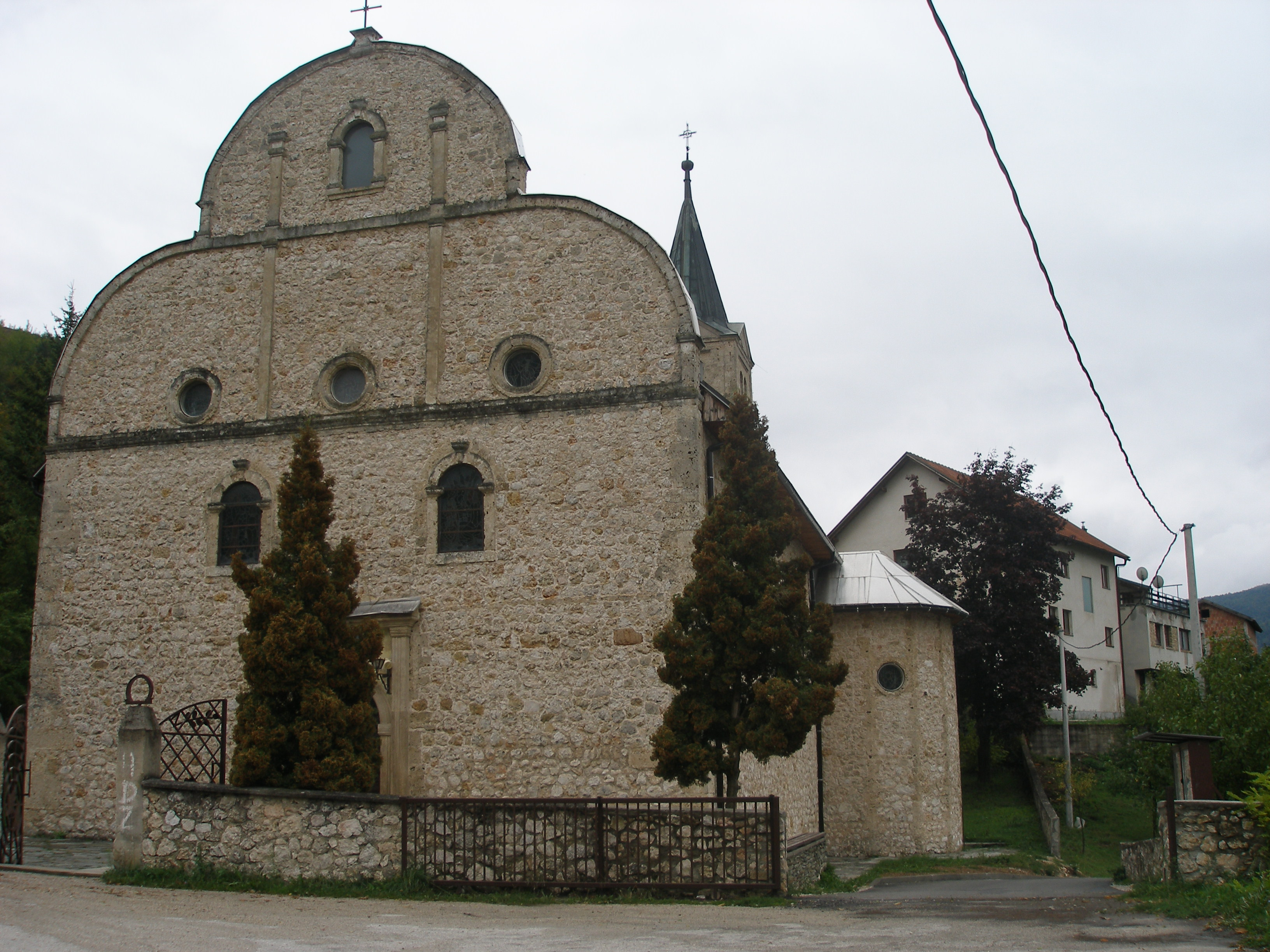

- Location within Bosnia and Herzegovina
- Coordinates: 44.244067°N 17.617696°E
- Country: Bosnia and Herzegovina
- Entity: Federation of Bosnia and Herzegovina
- Canton: Central Bosnia
- Municipality: Travnik

Area
  - Total: 0.79 sq mi (2.04 km^{2})
- Elevation: 2,507 ft (764 m)

Population (2013)
  - Total: 496
  - Density: 630/sq mi (243/km^{2})
- Time zone: UTC+1 (CET)
  - Summer (DST): UTC+2 (CEST)

Ovčarevo is a village in Travnik, Bosnia and Herzegovina.

== Demographics ==
According to the 2013 census, its population was 496.

Ethnicity in 2013
Ethnicity	Number	Percentage
Croats	495	99.8%
other/undeclared	1	0.2%
Total	496	100%
