= List of festivals in Europe =

Festivals of Europe
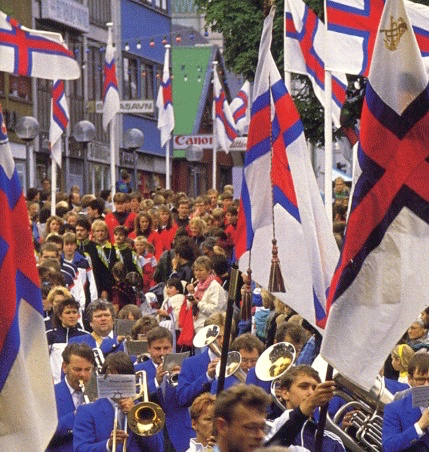
- Ólavsøka festival in Tórshavn.

General Information
- Subtopics: List of festivals, list of music festivals, list of film festivals
- Location: Europe, Asia
- Related topics: Culture of Europe

The following is an incomplete list of festivals in Europe, with links to separate lists by country and region where applicable. This list includes festivals of diverse types, including regional festivals, religious festivals, commerce festivals, film festivals, folk festivals, carnivals, recurring festivals on holidays, and music festivals. Some recurring European traditional festivals are over a thousand years old. Music festivals are annotated "(music)" for countries where there is not a dedicated music section.

The list overlaps with List of film festivals in Europe.

== Sovereign states ==
=== Albania ===
- Nowruz
- Summer Festival, Albania
- Gjirokastër National Folklore Festival
- International Film Summerfest of Durrës (film)

==== Music festivals in Albania ====
- Festivali i Këngës
- Netet e Klipit Shqiptar
- Top Fest
- Kënga Magjike

=== Andorra ===
- Public holidays in Andorra

=== Belarus ===
- Listapad (film)
- Slavianski Bazaar in Vitebsk
- Global Gathering (music)
- Ultra Europe (music)
- Unsound Festival (music)

=== Bosnia and Herzegovina ===
- Balkan Photo Festival
- Ballet Fest Sarajevo
- Baščaršija Nights
- Beton Fest
- Cultural Summer of Zvornik
- FEDU
- Festival Prijateljstva
- Five Days of Zagreb in Sarajevo
- Juventafest
- MESS
- OPEN Fest Sarajevo
- PitchWise Festival
- Pop-Up! Sarajevo
- Sarajevo Irish Festival
- Sarajevo Poetry Days
- Sarajevo Ramadan Festival
- Sarajevo Street Art Festival
- Sarajevo Winter Festival
- Spiritus Progenitum
- WARM Festival

==== Film festivals in Bosnia and Herzegovina ====
- Al Jazeera Balkans Documentary Film Festival
- Jahorina Film Festival
- Merlinka Festival
- Pravo Ljudski Film Festival
- Tuzla Film Festival
- Sarajevo Fashion Film Festival
- Sarajevo Film Festival
- Sarajevo Youth Film Festival
- VIVA Film Festival

==== Music festivals in Bosnia and Herzegovina ====
- BiH Color Festival
- Demofest
- Festival 84
- Golden Fairy Festival
- Jazz Fest Sarajevo
- Sarajevo Beer Festival
- Sarajevo Chamber Music Festival
- Sarajevo International Guitar Festival
- Sonemus Fest
- Rastok

=== Bulgaria ===
- International Chamber Music Festival Plovdiv
- Black Box International Festival
- Name days in Bulgaria
- National Children's Book Festival
- Sofia Pride
- Sofia International Film Festival (film)
- In the Palace International Short Film Festival (film)

==== Music festivals in Bulgaria ====
- European Grand Prix for Choral Singing
- Bultek
- Rozhen National Folklore Fair
- Slaveevi Noshti
- Loop Live
- Spirit of Burgas
- March Music Days
- Kavarna Rock Fest
- Golden Orpheus
- Hills of Rock
- Wrong Fest
- PhillGood Festival

=== Cyprus ===
- Kypria festival
- The AfroBanana Republic Festival (arts & music)
- Reggae Sunjam Festival
- Pafos Aphrodite Festival Cyprus
- Wine Festival of Cyprus
- International Festival of Ancient Greek Drama, Cyprus (theater)
- Pafos Aphrodite Festival Cyprus (theater)

=== The Czech Republic ===
==== Music festivals in the Czech Republic ====
- Metronome Festival Prague (arts & music)
- United Islands of Prague (arts & music)

=== Denmark ===
- Roskilde Festival
- SmukFest (Skanderborg Festival)
- Tinderbox Festival
- Copenhagen Distortion
- Copenhell
- List of festivals in Denmark

=== Estonia ===
- Baltic song festivals (music)
- Tallinn Black Nights Film Festival (film)

==== Music festivals in Estonia ====
- List of music festivals in Estonia

=== Finland ===
- List of festivals in Finland

=== France ===
- Fête des lumières, Lyon
- Nuits de Fourvière, Lyon
- Nuits Sonores, Lyon

=== Germany ===
- List of festivals in Germany
- German Fetish Ball

=== Greece ===
- Athens Festival
- Chaniartoon - International Comic & Animation Festival
- First Delphic Festival
- Second Delphic Festival
- Icarus Festival for Dialogue between Cultures
- Mykonos Biennale
- Patras Carnival
- VideoDance Festival, Greece
- Art Athina

==== Film festivals in Greece ====
- Drama International Short Film Festival
- Thessaloniki Festival of Greek Cinema
- Thessaloniki International Film Festival
- VideoDance Festival

==== Music festivals in Greece ====
- Chania Rock Festival
- Colour Day Festival
- Olympus Festival
- Plisskën Festival
- Rockwave Festival
- Thessaloniki Song Festival
- Peloponnese Beer Festival

==== Festivals in ancient Greece ====
- Ancient Olympic Games
- Panegyris
- Adonia
- Anthesphoria
- Cotyttia
- Delia (festival)
- Elaphebolia
- Eleusinian Mysteries
- Isthmian Games
- Nemean Games
- Panhellenic Games
- Pythian Games
- Hellotia
- Hybristica
- Noumenia
- Orgia
- Soteria (festival)
- Thalysia
- Theorica
- Thesmophoria
- Thesmophoriazusae

=== Hungary ===
- Budapest Fringe Festival (theater)
- Budapest Pride
- Kecskemét Animation Film Festival (film)
- Miskolc International Film Festival (film)
- Budapest Opera Ball
- Budapest Spring Festival
- Busójárás
- Café Budapest Contemporary Arts Festival
- Great Kurultáj
- Savaria Historical Carnival
- International Culture Week in Pécs
- LOW Festival
- Meat-jelly Festival
- Name days in Hungary
- Ökofeszt
- Sziget Festival
- 2nd World Festival of Youth and Students
- Plácido Domingo Classics

=== Iceland ===
- Beer Day (Iceland)
- Fiskidagurinn mikli
- Jól (Iceland)
- Þorrablót
- Menningarnótt
- Sequences Art Festival
- Reykjavík International Film Festival (film)
- Reykjavík Fringe Festival (arts festival)

==== Music festivals in Iceland ====
- Eistnaflug
- Folk music festival of Siglufjordur
- Iceland Airwaves
- Menningarnótt
- Nordic Music Days
- Þjóðhátíð
- Við Djúpið
- Secret Solstice

=== Ireland ===
- List of festivals in the United Kingdom

=== Latvia ===
- Go Blonde Festival
- Riga Salsa Festival
- Studentu paradīze
- 18 November Torchlight procession
- Baltic Pride
- Riga International Film Festival 2ANNAS (film)
- Lielais Kristaps (film)

==== Music festivals in Latvia ====
- Baltic song festivals
- Latvian Song and Dance Festival
- Positivus Festival
- Saulkrasti Jazz Festival
- Orient, the Festival of Eastern Music
- Europeade

=== Liechtenstein ===
- Public holidays in Liechtenstein

=== Lithuania ===
- Baltic song festivals
- Kaunas International Film Festival
- Kaziuko mugė
- Klaipėda Sea Festival
- Mados infekcija
- Užgavėnės
- Vilnius Book Fair
- Vilnius International Film Festival
- Yaga Gathering

=== Luxembourg ===
- Buergbrennen
- Dancing procession of Echternach
- Emaischen
- Octave celebration
- Schueberfouer

==== Music festivals in Luxembourg ====
- Open Air Field
- Echternach Music Festival
- Rock um Knuedler

=== Malta ===
- Maltese Carnival
- Nadur Carnival

==== Music festivals in Malta ====
- Festival Kanzunetta Indipendenza
- Malta Song Festival
- Isle of MTV
- L-Għanja tal-Poplu
- Malta Jazz Festival
- Malta Music Awards
- Malta Song for Europe
- Valletta International Baroque Festival

=== Moldova ===
- Public holidays in Moldova

=== Monaco ===
- Golden Nymph Award
- Monte-Carlo Television Festival
- The Spring Arts Festival
- Monaco International Film Festival (film)
- Monaco Music Film Festival (film)
- International Circus Festival of Monte-Carlo (theater)
- Mondial du Théâtre (theater)

=== Montenegro ===
- Merlinka festival
- MontenegroSong (music)
- Operosa (music)
- Pjesma Mediterana (music)
- Refresh Festival (music)
- Sea Dance Festival (music)
- Southern Soul Festival (music)
- Sunčane Skale (music)

=== The Netherlands ===
- Amsterdam Dance Event (music)
- Awakenings (music)
- Lowlands (music)
- Mysteryland (music)
- Pinkpop (music)
- Welcome to the Future (music)

=== Portugal ===
- List of festivals in Portugal

=== Romania ===
- List of festivals in Romania

=== Russia ===
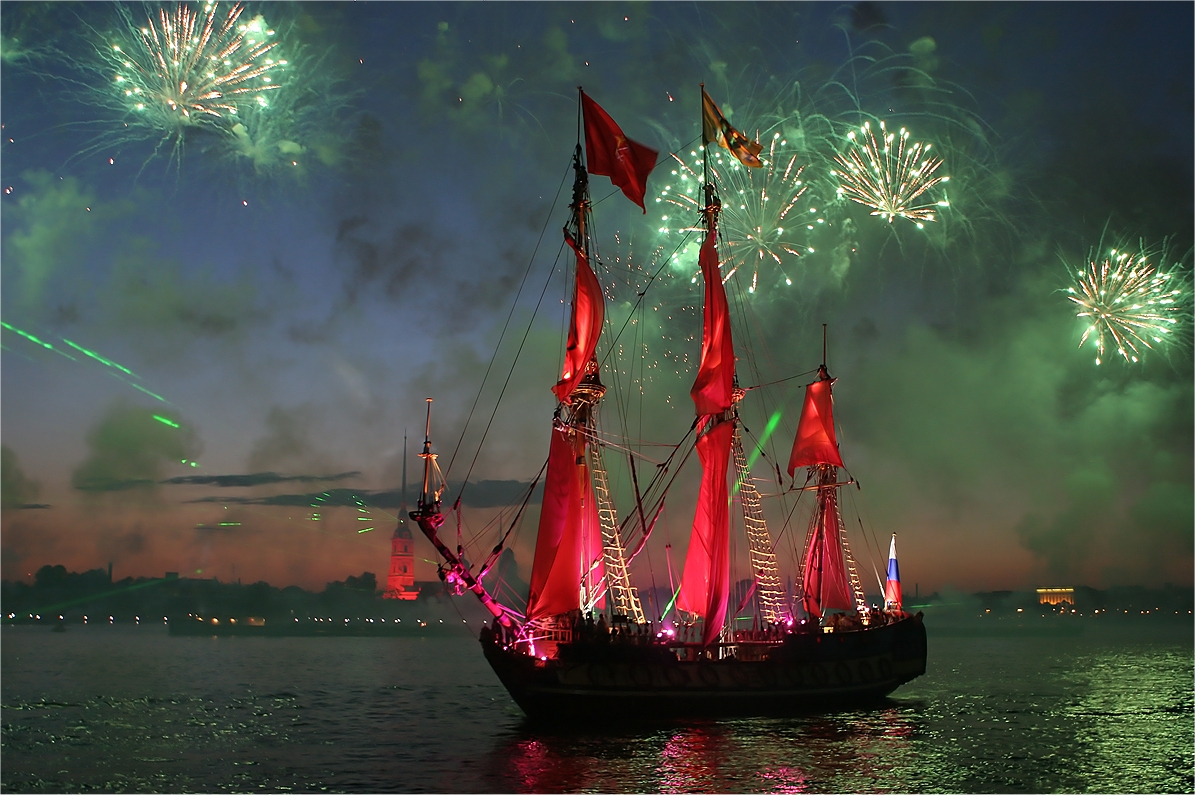
Alyye parusa, Scarlet Sails event held annually in Russia.

=== San Marino ===
- Public holidays in San Marino

=== Slovakia ===
- Public holidays in Slovakia
- Name days in Slovakia

==== Music festivals in Slovakia ====
- Bratislava Chamber Guitar
- Bratislava Music Festival
- GrapeFestival
- Košice Music Spring Festival
- Pohoda (music festival)
- Transmission (festival)
- Breathe Festival

=== Slovenia ===
- List of festivals in Slovenia

=== Spain ===
- El Ajo Festival
- Festival Jordi Savall in Catalonia

=== Switzerland ===
- List of festivals in Switzerland

=== United Kingdom ===
- List of festivals in the United Kingdom
  - List of music festivals in the United Kingdom
  - List of food festivals in the United Kingdom
- List of festivals in the United Kingdom by region
  - List of festivals in the Isle of Man

== States with limited recognition ==
=== Kosovo ===
Lists by region

- Events and festivals in Gjakova (city)
- Events and festivals in Pristina (city)
  - Film festivals in Pristina
- Events and festivals in Peja (city)

Festivals in Kosovo

- Flaka e Janarit
- Nowruz
- 40BunarFest
- Anibar International Animation Festival (film)
- DAM Festival Pristina (music)
- Chopin Piano Fest Pristina (music)
- NGOM Fest (music)
- Hasi Jehon (folklore)

=== Northern Cyprus ===
- Public holidays in Northern Cyprus

=== Transnistria ===
- Public holidays in Transnistria

== Dependencies and other territories ==
=== Åland ===
- Public holidays in Åland

=== The Faroe Islands ===
- Ólavsøka
- Stevna
- G! Festival (music)
- Summarfestivalurin (music)

=== Gibraltar ===
- GIB Fringe
- Gibraltar Chess Festival
- Gibraltar Music Festival (music)
- Gibraltar World Music Festival (music)

=== Guernsey ===
- Guernsey Festival of Performing Arts (music)

=== Jersey ===
- Jersey Eisteddfod
- Jersey Folklore Festival
- Jersey Live (music)
- Branchage (film)

=== Isle of Man ===
- List of festivals in the Isle of Man

=== Svalbard ===
- Culture of Svalbard

== See also ==
- List of festivals
- List of film festivals
- List of music festivals
