= Street art in Sarajevo =

Street art and subculture in Sarajevo, Bosnia

Street Art in Ciglane.

Sarajevo, the capital of Bosnia and Herzegovina has gained international fame for its diverse range of street art and associated subcultures. The city has a long history of street art that was first tied to various subcultures in the 1970s and 1980s. During the Bosnian war political and anti-war street art was one of the main artistic focal points of the besieged city. Today, Sarajevo is a European center for street art and hosts two international festivals dedicated to the art form.

== History ==
Sarajevo war-time guerrilla art shown in The Hunting Party

Throughout the 1970s and 1980s, much of the city's youth was influenced by the graffiti of New York, which subsequently became popular in Sarajevo's suburbs and working-class neighborhoods such as Alipašino Polje, and along the railway and tram lines. With the arrival of the Punk and Mod subcultures to the Former Yugoslavia, as well as the rise of the New Primitives movement, street art became extremely prevalent in the city.

Even though street art was present in Sarajevo while Bosnia and Herzegovina was part of Yugoslavia, it only truly became prevalent with the start of the Bosnian war in 1992, when the city came under siege. Numerous art collectives tied to the Sarajevo Academy of Fine Arts, the Academy of Performing Arts in Sarajevo and formal institutions such as Collegium Artisticum used street art to call attention to what was happening in the country.

Since the war, the city has become a hotbed for street art, with the local government endorsing the creation of various street art quarters and having a lenient attitude towards this form of artistic expression.

== Styles ==
=== Guerrilla art ===
Street Art by Kerim Mušanović

Guerrilla art is the most common form of street art found in Sarajevo. Guerrilla artists increasingly seem to be moving towards a philosophy of painting a continuous work of art, adding to it over time as less developed elements of the piece are erased by graffiti cleaning efforts or in the battle for space. The most important development in the street art movement and the reason for its 'guerrilla' tag is the adoption of guerrilla marketing techniques over traditional artistic methods. The use of guerrilla marketing methods to create ‘artistic publicity’ has seen the evolution away from artists as creative individuals and towards artists as brands. This style of street art was first adopted by Sarajevan street artists during the Siege.

=== Street installations ===
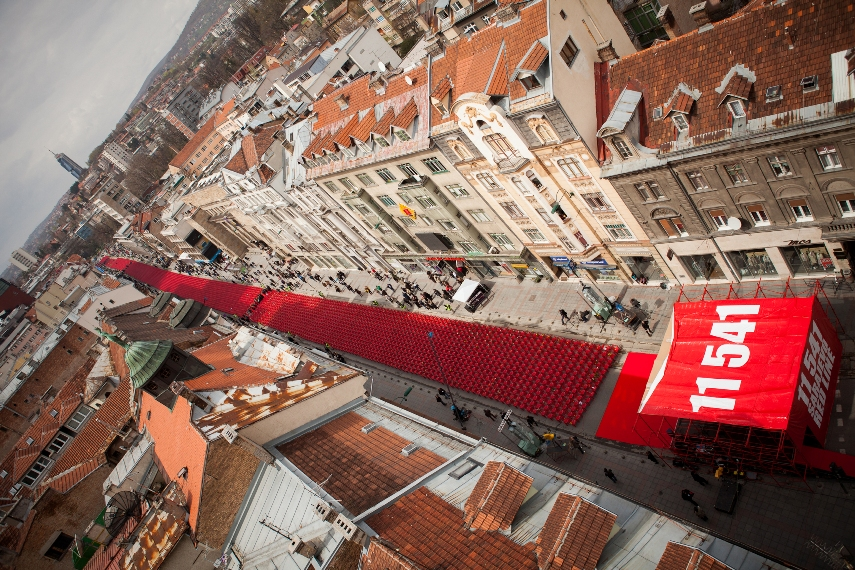
Sarajevo Red Line street installation

Street installations have become a regular form of artistic expression in Sarajevo since the war. The most well-known was the Sarajevo Red Line, held on April 6, 2012, in Maršal Tito Street and it consisted of a large chair installation, street exhibition of war posters and a concert.

=== Ultras street art ===
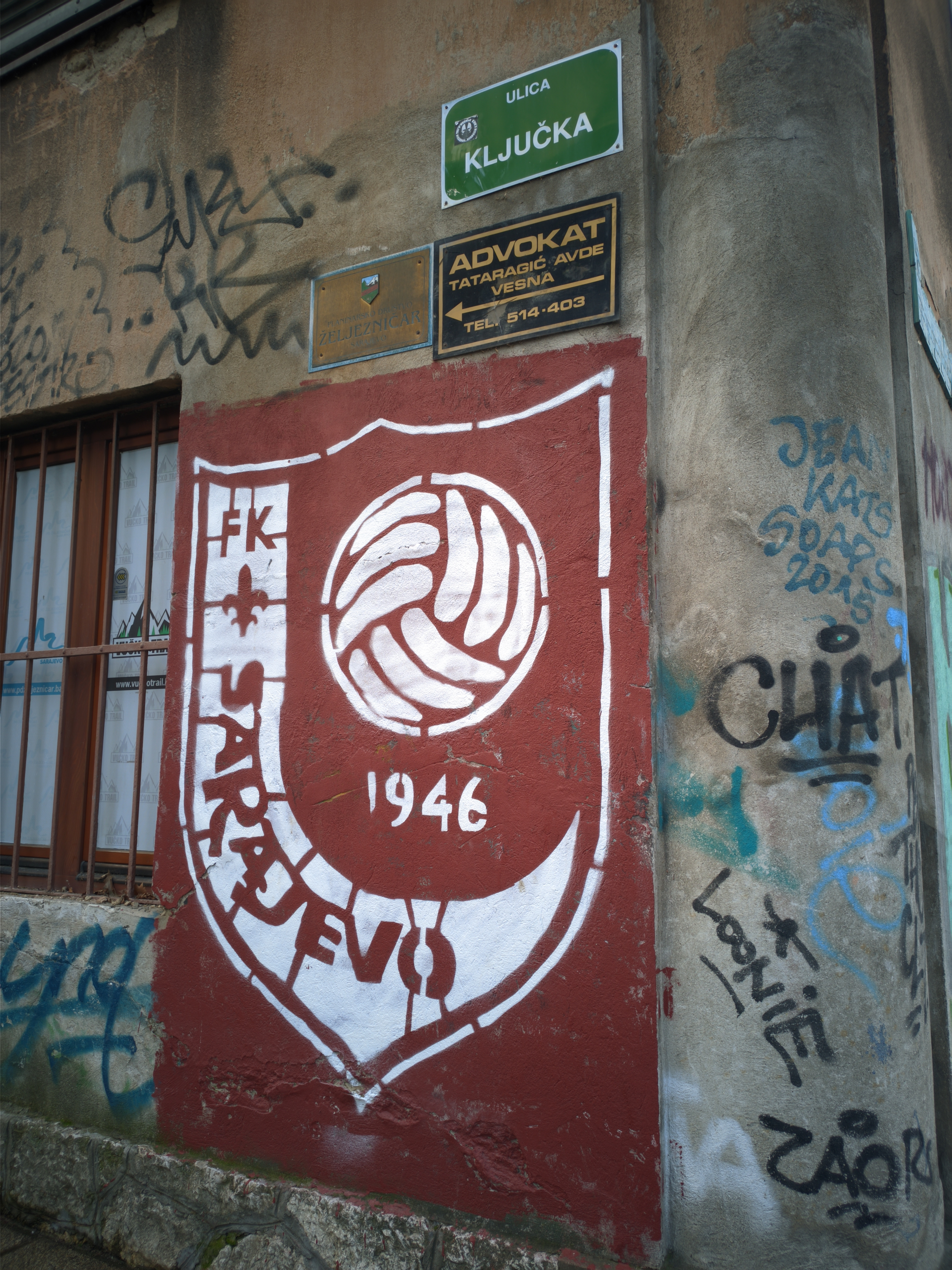
Football Street Art

The Ultras subculture is a type of football fan renowned for ultra-fanatical support. The subculture is predominantly tied to association football, with members following association football teams. Sarajevo's two major football clubs, FK Sarajevo and FK Željezničar both have organized Ultras groups, with the former being supported by Horde Zla and the latter being supported by Manijaci. Both groups have partaken in the creation of numerous examples of street art that can be found across the city.

=== War memorials ===
Large colourful murals and images decorate some of the derelict and crumbling walls of Sarajevo's suburbs, acting to commemorate victims of the war or to distract people from the unrepaired damage.

== Sarajevo Rose ==
A Sarajevo Rose is a concrete scar caused by a mortar shell's explosion that was later filled with red resin. Mortar rounds landing on concrete create a unique fragmentation pattern that looks almost floral in arrangement. Because Sarajevo was a site of intense urban warfare and suffered thousands of shell explosions during the Siege of Sarajevo, the marked concrete patterns are a unique feature to the city. Throughout the city, explosion marks have been filled with red resin to mark where mortar explosions resulted in one or more deaths.

== Festivals ==
Sarajevo Olympics bobsled

Sarajevo hosts two international festivals dedicated to street art. The Sarajevo Street Art Festival is held in July of every year and lasts for three days. Each year's edition is made up of numerous street performances, the creation of a new street art quarter in the city, concerts, the painting of large murals and the showcasing of other creative art forms.

Beton Fest is an international 3D street art festival that is held in July of every year and lasts for five days. It is the only 3D street art festival in Southeastern Europe and has hosted many renowned street artists such as Vera Bugatti, Giovanna la Pietra, Tony Cuboliquido, Manuel Bastante and others.

Apart from the two major street art festivals, Sarajevo also hosts Pop-Up! Sarajevo and the Pop Art Festival which organize street art conferences and workshops.

== Gallery ==
Mural of Davorin Popović in Radićeva.

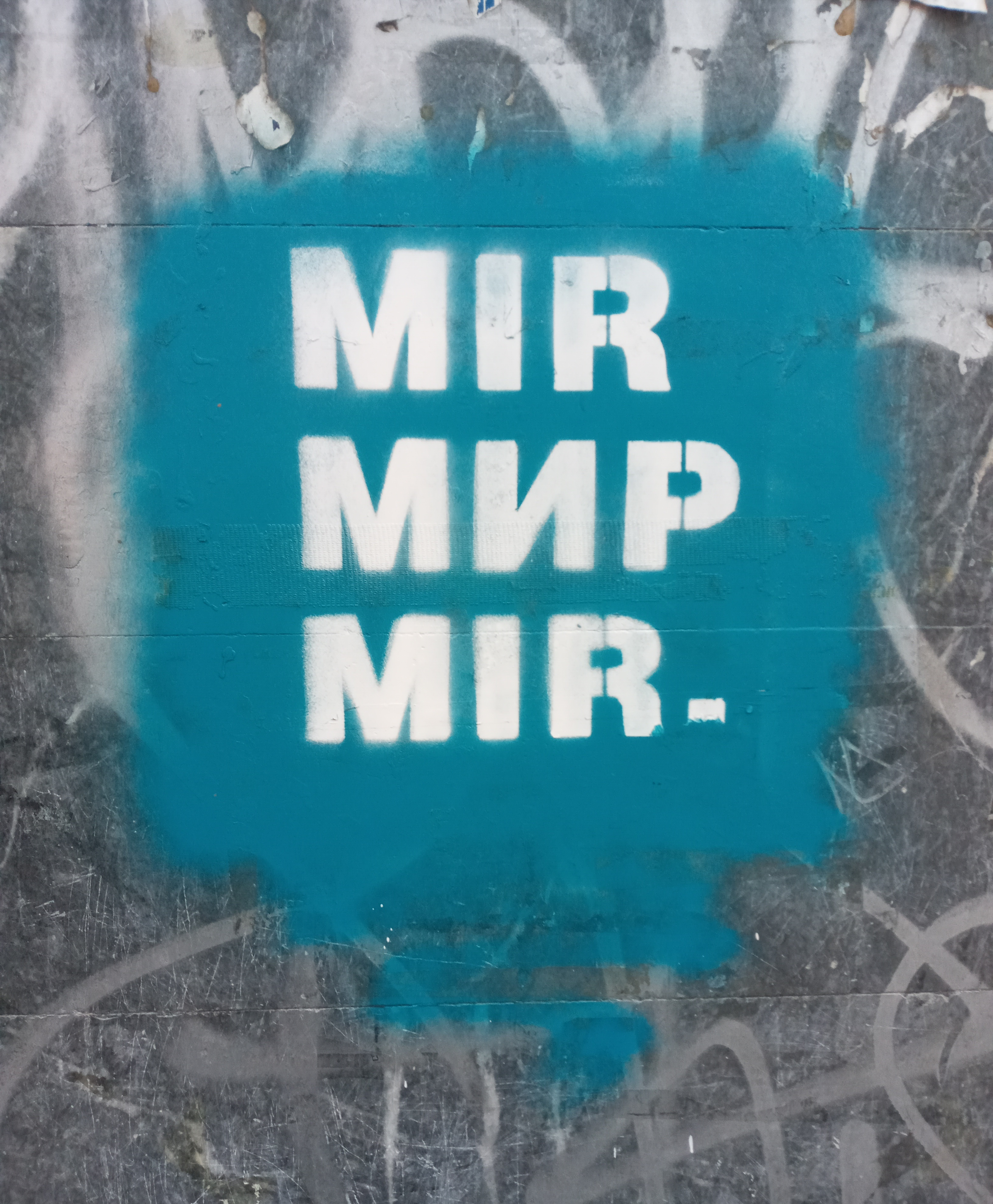
Peace in Bosnian, Serbian and Croatian

Street Art in Sarajevo by Rikardo Druškić.

Mural of Jovan Divjak.

Mural of David Bowie at the University Campus.

Sarajevo Street Art.
