= Phedonas Phedonos =

Cypriot lawyer and politician

- Φαίδωνας Φαίδωνος
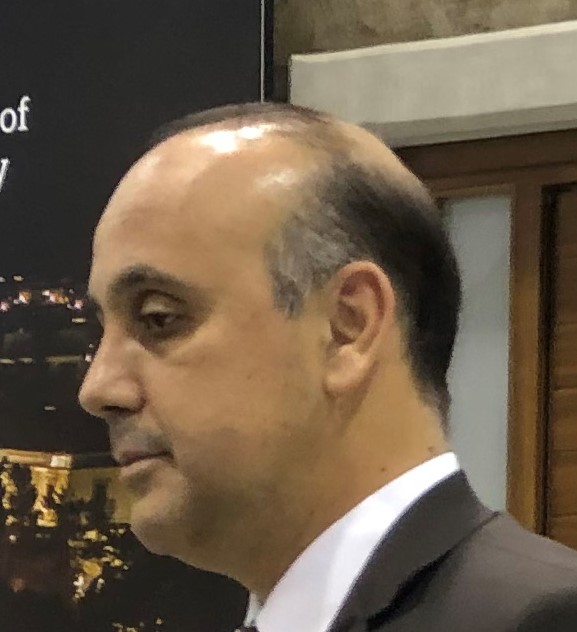

Mayor of Paphos
- Incumbent
- Assumed office 11 January 2015

Personal details
- Born: 18 June 1978 (age 47) Paphos, Cyprus
- Party: Democratic Rally
- Occupation: Lawyer, politician

Phedonas Phedonos born 18 June 1978) is a Cypriot lawyer and politician. He has served as mayor of Paphos since January 2015. In February 2026, he was placed on compulsory leave from office pending criminal investigations.

== Early life and education ==
Phedonos was born in Paphos on 18 June 1978. According to the Municipality of Paphos, he studied International and European Economic Studies at the Athens University of Economics and Business and completed postgraduate studies in international and European studies, before studying law at Neapolis University Paphos.

== Career ==
From 2002 to 2006, he worked as a parliamentary associate. From 2006 to 2014, he was employed in the private sector.

Phedonos served as District Secretary of the Paphos branch of the Democratic Rally party from 2003 to 2012. In 2011, he was elected a municipal councillor of Paphos. During his term, he served as a member of the Paphos Sewerage Board and as chair of the Urban Planning and Technical Matters Committee. From 2012 to 2015, he was a member of the Board of Appeals.

He was elected mayor of Paphos in a by-election on 11 January 2015. He was re-elected in the municipal elections of 2016. He won re-election again in June 2024.

During his term as mayor, Phedonos served as president of the company Pafos Aphrodite Festival Cyprus, which organises the Paphos Aphrodite Festival. He was also involved in activities related to the Paphos 2017 European Capital of Culture programme.

== Legal matters ==
In February 2026, he was placed on compulsory leave from office pending criminal investigations. On 12 February 2026, he lost a bid at the Administrative Court to overturn the leave decision, according to Cyprus Mail and in-cyprus (Philenews). On 19 February 2026, Cyprus Mail reported that he gave a statement to police as investigations continued.

== Personal life ==
Phedonos is married to Louiza Andreou. They have two children.
