= Events and festivals in Peja =

Peja is a city located at the western part of the Kosovo. Numerous cultural activities and events are organized each year in the city.

== Events ==
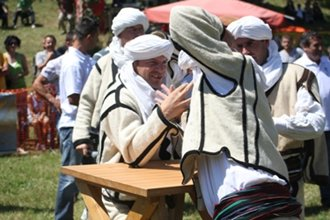
games

=== Rugova Traditional Games ===
Rugova Traditional Games, are among the most frequented cultural events in Peja, representing the values inherited throughout the years in the Rugoves jane " Lojrat Tradicionale ne Rugove. Wrestling is the main activity in this program, accompanied by other types of sports, traditional food, and drinks. These games have been successfully carried out throughout the past two decades, being an avenue of expression for the original values of skill games, songs, and dances of the Rugova region.

=== International literary meetings " Azem Shkreli " ===
Azem Shkreli was and still is the most renowned representative of the Kosovo Albanians born during the literary period of the 60s. The International Literary Meetings "Azem Shkreli", where many writers and linguists participate, is organized annually in honor of this writer. The purpose of organizing this cultural event coincides with raising awareness for cultural and literary values, for functioning and promoting primary factor for personality formation, transmission of knowledge and understanding of the cultural diffusion of knowledge in scientific and cultural research. With a decision of the Municipal Assembly, KK të Pejës, "AzemShkreli" Literary Meetings were initiated in 2002, and continue even today in memory of the day of death of the famous poet and playwright, AzemShkreli. The following two prices are awarded in this festival:

- "Bulzat" Award
- "Literary Meeting AzemShkreli" Award

Qerim Ujkani, Laureate of "AzemShkreli" price for 2011 said that, to himthe award is recognition from his birthplace and represents a debt that he has constantly returned to itthroughout his works."I think it is a mutual honor, which I particularly welcome, and having a different spirit, this event is one of the most attractive meetings held in Kosovo. While the price "Bulëzat" was won by Qendresë Sadrija from Peja.

== Festivals ==
=== ANIBAR ===
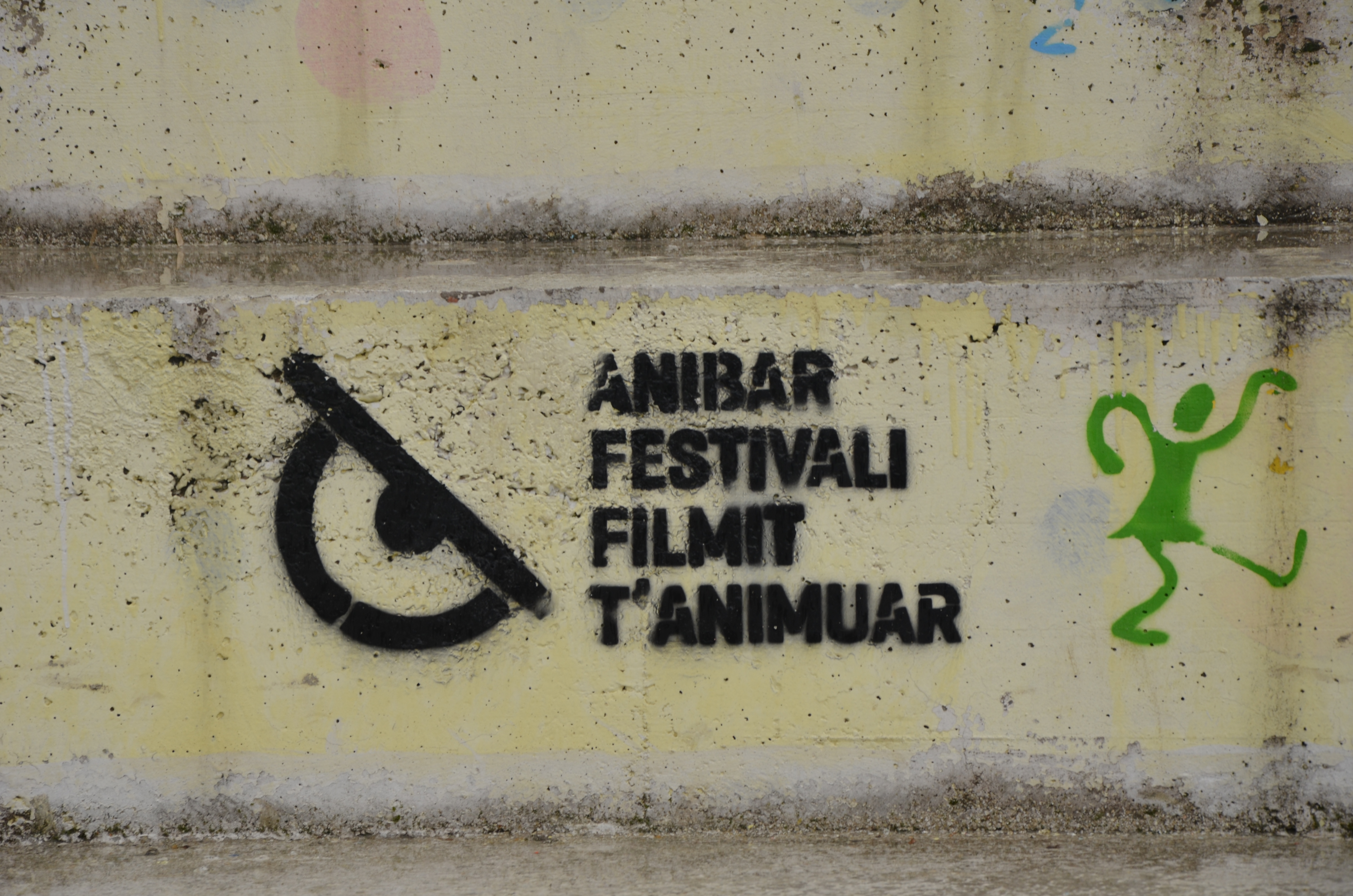
Anibar

AniBar International Animation Festival Animation Festival ' is the only festival in terms of animated movies in Kosovo which takes place during August 9 to 14 in the city of Peja. Anibar Festival is organized by the NGO ' Anibar Group. The purpose of the festival is to show the latest global trends in the field of animated movies to the public Kosovo and the creation of environment for young writers who deal with the creativity of Animated movies. During the festival musicians from different places in Kosovo and abroad present their work, but without hesitation they also organize workshops with different topics about the animated film. Anibar Festival has started in August 2010, with the main aim of creating a new platform in Kosovo for the animated film genre, as well as encourage and enable young authors in the creation of new work with classic and contemporary techniques. Animated films from various countries, such as Europe, Africa, Asia, USA and Latin America, are divided into four different categories:

- International,
- Ballkans,
- Students,
- Kids.

Besides the screenings during the festival there are also "Talks" or discussions with directors of the movies participating in the festival and workshops with different topics regarding the animated film. Upon completion of screenings, each night throughout the festival parties are hosted with "live" music by DJs and bands from Kosovo and the region. According to Nancy Phelps "This year Anibar created its first Quick Response book to promote animators worldwide. The Anibar Film Book is an innovative, one-of-a-kind book in Kosovo created in a collaboration between the festival and Mad Artists Publishing in Canada. Along with information about the festival and the films shown in past years, the book is encoded with Quick Response (QR) Codes that immediately link to all the encoded films instantly. With a smart phone or tablet you can scan the code and view the films on demand. All works that are made available have the animator's permission to be encoded. Of course any film is always best when viewed on a big screen but this seems to be a wonderful way to make international animation available, especially in countries where access to animation is limited." Anibar International Animaion Festival

=== Into the Park ===
The Festival Into the Park is a cultural event which is organized in the city of Peja during June by the NGO called Info Group, which is part of the "Music Man". The festival program consists of musical concerts, training sessions, debates, artistic programs dedicated to the environment, and tourist expeditions. According to director G.Gorani, "the main purpose of this festival is the exchange of experiences among artists of different fields, by exhibiting their talent to the local, regional and international audience, then raising the artistic awareness, promoting tourism natural values of this region." In the framework of music programs there are participants from the local, regional and international areal. The festival crew takes care of the visitors who come from other cities to settle in the camp which is situated near the locations where the festival is held. Also during this festival, organizers care to create the promotional scene for young musicians with musical bands which are selected through the application that will perform during the festival days. The music program of the festival INTO THE PARK consists of bands, DJs, and visual artists. One of the priorities of this program is about cultural heritage under certain programs characterized by photographic exhibitions with heritage content. The photos contain mainly images with a main theme of heritage with objects with traditional and religious content, ancient cities, tourist places, etc. Part of the program is the heritage documentary screenings in the Mill environment Haji Zeka, respectively for the environmental protection organization - " ERA " Into the Park Festival has already created an application for smart phones in order to ease visitors' access to the festival, festival programs, maps etc.

=== Shqip Film Fest ===
The project was successfully implemented during the two years in Municipality of Peja, and it was attended by artists, filmmakers and producers from 28 different countries of the world. This was all because of the great importance of having the festival in cinematic art. During the nights of the festival there are also workshops which are held with foreign and domestic filmmakers, directors, producers and actors, as well as discussions about the possibilities of coproduction movies.

Festival gives four awards:

- Best Actor and Actress,
- Best screenplay and animation festival
- Price " Faruk Begolli "
- and the main award for the best film

The festival already has become one of the most successful festivals in Kosovo and the region. The uniqueness of this festival is the idea of the organizers, who have found a way through the festival to promote culture, art, especially Albanian tradition. In the third edition of the International Festival Shqip Film Fest , the festival organizers have managed to bring four members of the jury for the first time who have won Oscar Dritan Huqi is the only Albanian member of the jury who will join four other members of the jury who have won Academy Awards Waleed Moursi, Zach Hayer, Rajeev Dassani, dhe Gregg Helvey
