= Rastok =

Tourism in Bosnia and Herzegovina

Urban Music Fest RASTOK
- Genre: rock, punk, electronica, metal, hip hop
- Dates: Two days, starting on the first weekend of August
- Locations: (Bosnia and Herzegovina) Jelah, Bosnia
- Years active: 2003–present
- Website: www.rastok.ba

RASTOK (also known as Urban Music Fest RASTOK) is an annual summer music festival on Plateau Rastoke in Jelah, Bosnia and Herzegovina. It has been staged annually since 2003, usually on the first weekend of August.

In the beginning the festival was for rock bands, but coverage spread to punk, alternative rock, metal, dub, reggae, ska, jazz and other fusions of urban sound. The festival was held in Jelah under the name Jelah Summer.

== Organizers ==
UMF Rastok Organizer is a united youth organization of young people from Jelah. The festival, organized by activists from JOM and a large number of volunteers, is for mostly young people from Bosnia and Herzegovina and other countries.

== History ==
=== Rock Festival Rastok 2003 ===
Rock Festival Rastok 2003 was held on the town square in Jelah on 29 and 30 July 2003.

Stage
Tuesday	Wednesday
Manessagra (Bosnia and Herzegovina); Betty Ford Soundtrack (Bosnia and Herzegovina); Puls asfalta (Bosnia and Herzegovina); Znak (Bosnia and Herzegovina); Cabezas De Amazonia (Bosnia and Herzegovina); Vatrena Voda (Bosnia and Herzegovina)	Toxicdeath (Bosnia and Herzegovina); Predgrupa (Bosnia and Herzegovina); Alfa (Bosnia and Herzegovina); Offside (Bosnia and Herzegovina); Dbauiazadjale (Bosnia and Herzegovina); Semantic (Bosnia and Herzegovina); Spress (Bosnia and Herzegovina)

=== Urban Music Fest Rastok 2006 ===
Urban Music Fest Rastok 2006 was held on the Rastoke plateau, Jelah on 4 and 5 August 2006:

Stage
Saturday	Sunday
Maršal (Bosnia and Herzegovina); Perishment (Bosnia and Herzegovina); MetalShoplifters (Serbia); Euforia (Serbia); Autogeni Trening (Montenegro); No Rules (Bosnia and Herzegovina); Dubioza Kolektiv (Bosnia and Herzegovina)	Klub Igrača (Croatia); Slum (Bosnia and Herzegovina); KHJBC (Bosnia and Herzegovina); Minimum System Requirements (Croatia); Mija & Co. (Bosnia and Herzegovina); Corbansick (Bosnia and Herzegovina); Zabranjeno Pušenje (Bosnia and Herzegovina)

=== Urban Music Fest Rastok 2008 ===
Urban Music Fest Rastok 2008 was held on the on Rastoke plateau, Jelah on 2 and 3 August 2008:

Stage

Motherfunky (Bosnia and Herzegovina)
Društvo skrivenih talenata (Montenegro)
Sake (Croatia)
Sopot (Bosnia and Herzegovina)
DJ Ježek (Bosnia and Herzegovina)
DJ Saša Petković (Bosnia and Herzegovina)
Letu Štuke (Bosnia and Herzegovina)

=== Urban Music Fest Rastok 2009 ===
Promo Urban Music Fest Rastok 2009 was held on the Sports court in Jelah on 13 July 2009 while Urban Music Fest Rastok 2009 was held on 30 June and 1 August 2009 at the Rastoke Plateau, Jelah.

Promo Fest

Dee Jay baX (Bosnia and Herzegovina)
Life is short (Bosnia and Herzegovina)
Mija & Co. (Bosnia and Herzegovina)
Elemental (Croatia)

Main Stage
Friday	Saturday
Soul Infection (Bosnia and Herzegovina); Zhizhe & NodyBeatz (Bosnia and Herzegovina); Heron (Bosnia and Herzegovina); Vr4g (Bosnia and Herzegovina); Innergate (Croatia); Dramolet (Bosnia and Herzegovina); Pajperov smijeh (Bosnia and Herzegovina); Vatrena Voda (Bosnia and Herzegovina); Kerber (Serbia)	DeeJayBax (Bosnia and Herzegovina); Bad Seasons (Bosnia and Herzegovina); Groove Orchestra (Serbia); MaJaBa (Bosnia and Herzegovina); KillingJazzHardCoreBaby (Bosnia and Herzegovina); Night Shift (Serbia)

=== Urban Music Fest Rastok 2010 ===
Urban Music Fest Rastok 2010 was held on the Rastoke plateau, Jelah on 2 August 2010.

Main Stage

DJ Sehsson (Bosnia and Herzegovina)
Dee Jay baX (Bosnia and Herzegovina)
Josip A Lisac (Serbia)
Mohatra (Bosnia and Herzegovina)
Pasiv (Bosnia and Herzegovina)
Mohatra (Bosnia and Herzegovina)
Edo Maajka (Bosnia and Herzegovina)
