= Bratislava Chamber Guitar =

Bratislava Chamber Guitar Festival
- Genre: Chamber music, Guitar
- Locations: Bratislava, Slovakia
- Years active: 2005–present
- Founders: Miriam Rodriguez Brüllová
- Website: www.bratislavafestival.sk

The Bratislava Chamber Guitar Festival, (Slovak: Festival Bratislavská komorná gitara), is a guitar festival hosted in Bratislava, Slovakia since 2005. The festival is held every year in April and lasts between 4 and 5 days.

The festival focuses in chamber music that involves classical guitar, but is not limited to guitarists only. During the multiple performances that have been given at the festival various chamber music ensembles have performed.

Over the years many artists from all over the world (Argentina, Italy, Israel, Russia, Brasil, Uruguay, Greece, Spain, Hungary) played at the concerts. Among the performers Álvaro Pierri, Duo Melis and Katona Twins have played at the festival in the past years.

== See also ==
- List of music festivals
