= Events and festivals in Gjakova =

Events and festivals in Gjakova are highly valued if not great in number. The historical city of Gjakova, Kosovo, especially the Old Bazaar (Çarshia), is the hub of many outdoor and indoor festivals, cultural events and street parades, and is a main attraction for tourists. Many events only take place once, while others are organised regularly on an annual basis by festival societies. Some of the events are organised by the city and others by private companies.

The list below shows the main events and festivals in Gjakova.

== Events ==
=== 100 Thousand Poets For Change ===
100 Thousand Poets for Change is an international educational organization focusing on the arts, especially poetry, music, and the literary arts. 100 Thousand Poets for Change started in 2011 in Gjakova, organized by the National Center of Poets, Writers and Artists (Q.K.P.SH.A 'Gjakova'). The gathering is held over two days in September, during which there are literary hours and cultural meetings. A co-event organized by Pegasi Internacional Albania-Kosova recognizes artists and writers with awards for their cultural contributions, as selected by a professional jury. The gathering attracts poets who want to make positive changes on society with their works.

=== Accapello ===
Accapello is an international gathering of female choirs, organized by the music school Prenk Jakova. The first edition was held on 29–31 January 2014. On the first evening, its program presented the choir of the school Prenk Jakova and the female choir Nerazdelni from Kyustendi, Bulgaria, with lead conductor Wesela Petrova. On the second night, the festival presented female choir Wox Art from Pristina with lead conductor Ylber Asllanaj, and a mixed choir from Ferizaj. On the third night, the festival presented the female choir Polifonia from Sofia, with lead conductor Judmilla Gerova.

=== BarCamp Gjakova ===
BarCamp Gjakova is a recurrent event which attracts people to hear experts speak on a subject, the theme of which changes at each gathering. More than 120 people gathered in Gjakova for the first BarCamp organized in this city. BarCamp Gjakova is organized by Active Civilian Community (Komuniteti Aktiv Qytetar – KAQ) and supported by IPKO Foundation.

=== Building Europe at Home ===
Building Europe at Home was an event organized by CeLIM, Gjakova Youth Center, She Era and Municipality of Gjakova, held from 7 to 9 May 2015. The event was based on emphasizing peace and unity among European states. During these days many activities took place: seminars, NGO (non-governmental organization) fair, scavenger hunts, cinema, art activities for children, information events, and mural art. The overall objective of the project was to increase the awareness of young Kosovars between 15 and 29 years of age to the existence of valid opportunities to build their futures in Kosovo. The action was aimed specifically to underline the importance of volunteerism, the social function of culture and art in the evolutionary path of a democratic society, and to inform about work and international mobility opportunities offered by foreign programs and organizations. The first day put the focus entirely on active citizenship and volunteerism, the second day on international mobility and employment, while the third day was dedicated to art and culture.

=== DigiGjakova ===
DigiGjakova was a competition that aimed to create solutions that would solve some of the citizens' problems. Software developers gathered for an intense weekend of application development from 21 to 22 November 2015. Its goals were to improve the process of recruiting, the visualization of the budget, and the controlling of invoices. Participants were mentored by eight technology professionals. The three best projects were awarded €4,000 to continue development. The project was supported by The Municipality of Gjakova, Swiss Cooperation Office in Kosovo, BONEVET Centre, and the United Nations Development Programme (UNDP). The competition aimed to contribute directly to increased transparency at the local level and promote civic engagement in terms of providing solutions.

=== Crowdsourcing Week Summit ===
Local and international speakers gathered in Gjakova for a one-day conference to share how crowdsourcing is reshaping industries and transforming organizations. It was held on 1 October 2015. Over 10 different crowdsourcing industry experts and practitioners showed how crowdsourcing and the crowd economy can truly reinvigorate cities, accelerate entrepreneurship and engage citizens and local communities. This event was organized in partnership with BONEVET, Kosovo's leading non-profit Makerspace. The summit consisted of an interactive day of learning and case-studies for entrepreneurs, cities, governments, and communities to understand the opportunities within the crowd economy, and a meaningful conversation about how it can specifically be applied in Gjakova.

== Festivals ==
=== Përralla ===
Përralla is a music festival which has been held annually in the park of Shkugëz in Gjakovë. The first edition was held during 9–10 May 2014. In 2015, Përralla was held from 7–10 May. The festival featured local singers, bands, DJs and prominent Kosovar musicians.

=== Gjakova Film Festival ===
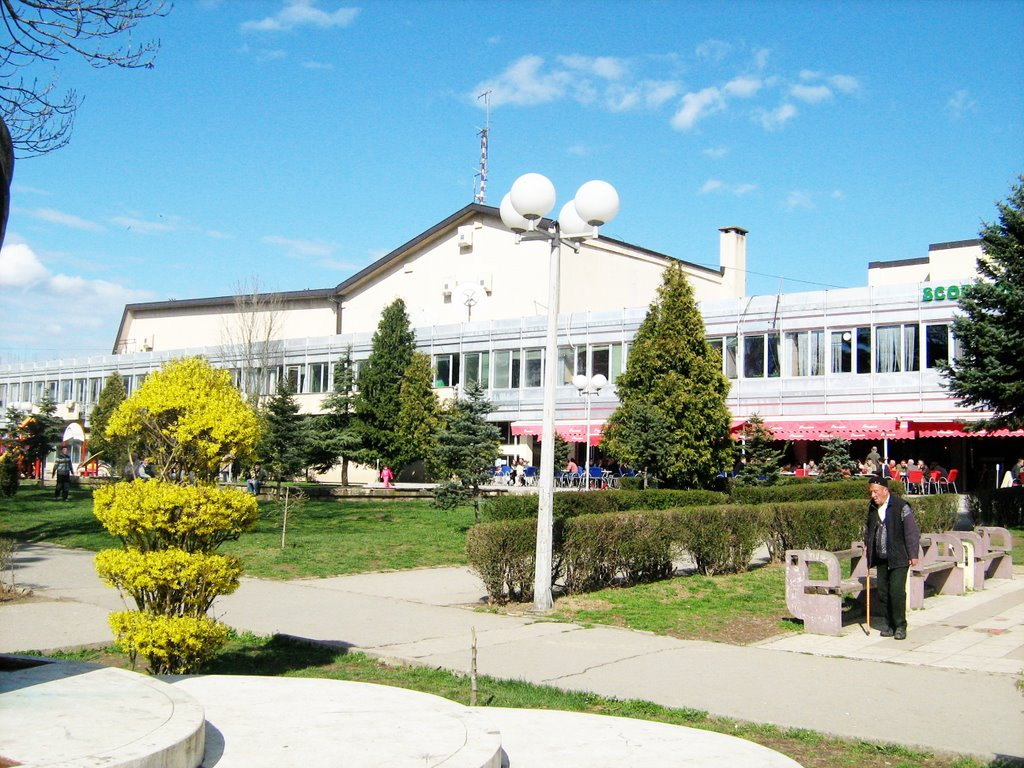
The Palace of Culture, Pallati i kulturës "Asim Vokshi" in Gjakovë where Gjakova Film Festival is held

Gjakova Film Festival is an international short-film festival. This festival is organized in cooperation of the Culture Department of Gjakova and the Association of the Writers and Artists 'Etuta'. This festival was first held in March 2012. The winner of the first event was a movie from Czech Republic, "The Bridge", directed by William Zabka. 11 prizes were awarded at the festival, two of which featured the well-known actress Arta Dobroshi. The second event was held on 21–24 March 2013, on the cultural palace 'Asim Vokshi'. During this event, 24 short selections were shown from 20 different movies. The first prize went to the Bulgarian movie "Travel Trip" of Radostina Naikova. A special prize went to "Kolona" by Ujkan Hysa, which had been recognized in many different international film festivals. The third annual event was held from 21 to 23 March, during which many movies from different states of the world were shown.

=== Komedia Fest ===
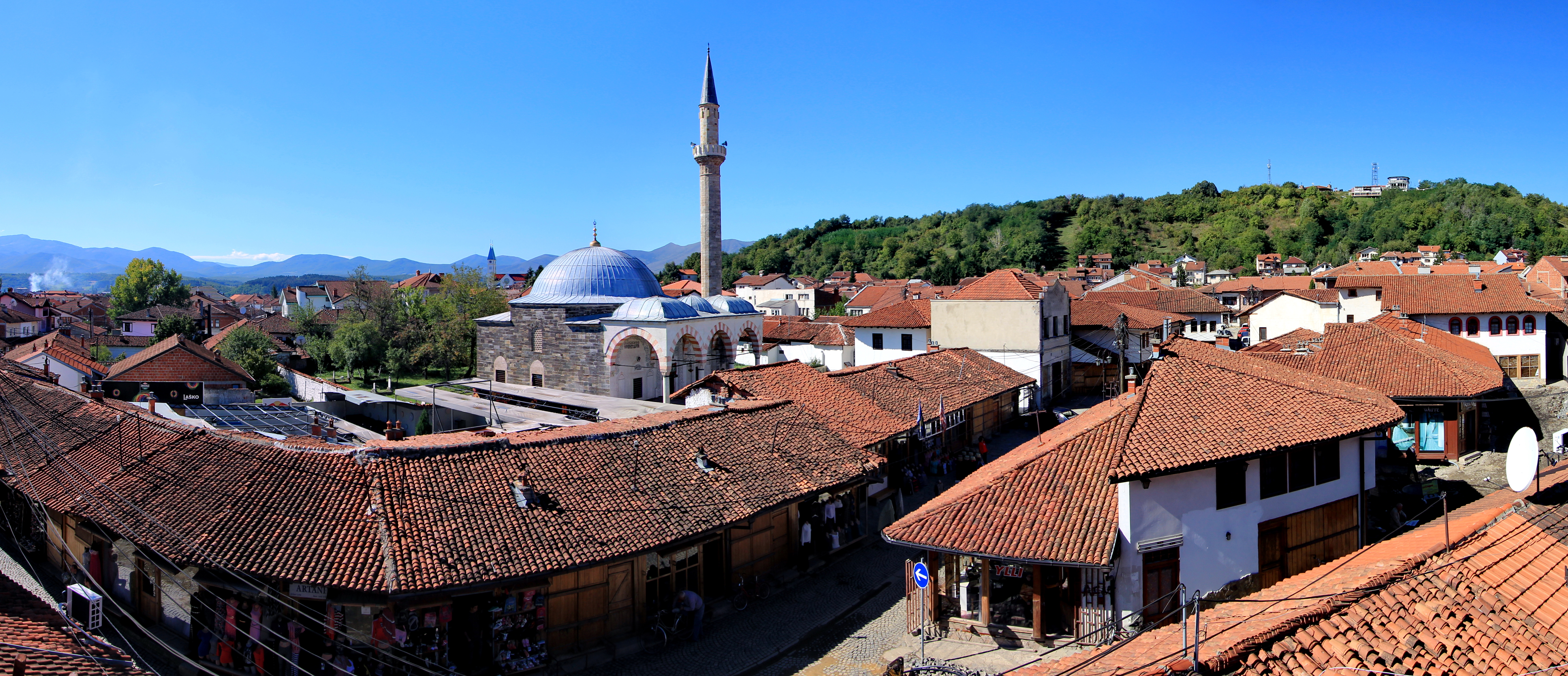
Picture of Old Bazaar where most of the activities of 'Komedia Fest' are held

Komedia Fest is a comedy festival which ran from 17 March to 23 September 2012, and has been held every year since then. The festival's main center of activity was the Old Bazaar in Gjakovë. Many different plays are put on stage by national theatrical troupes, mostly from the genre of comedy, with the addition of music concerts, handicraft fairs, and art exhibitions. Theatrical troupes from The National Theatre of Prishtina, The Comedy Theatre of Tirana, The Theatres of Fier, Skopje and Tetovo have taken part. Albanian representatives of arts and culture from Italy, Montenegro, and Çamëria were guests of Komedia Fest. Its main focus is promoting the city's cultural heritage and artistic values. The second edition was held from 9 to 15 September 2013. The third edition of Komedia Fest, held from 6 to 14 September 2014, had risen to an international level and incorporated performances from European guests throughout the days. There was a sense of rising awareness for other institutions of cultural heritage, focusing activities in the Ethnographic Museum of Gjakova. During these days of performance activities, artists and festival guests had a chance to interact and discuss many different issues related to the genre of comedy. This edition was also included a program of animated comedy movies, screened on the museum wall. This project has been identified in the Local Cultural Heritage Plan of Gjakova, and was implemented by NGO "National Comedy Festival" as part of the initiative "Culture Days in Gjakova" held during 2014, financed jointly by CHwB Kosovo, Municipality of Gjakova and other partners.

=== Radio Fest ===
Radio Fest presents the achievements of radio stations in reporting and publicity spots, with the aim of stimulating the creativity of radio workers. Included are local and national radio stations from Kosovo and across Albania. Radio Fest was first organized in November 2005, and has developed into a traditional event.

=== Lyra Fest ===
Lyra Fest is a traditional and national festival of children's song, hosting child participants from all areas where the Albanian language is spoken, allowing children between the ages 6 and 13 to compete. It has been held since November 2007, in cultural palace 'Asim Vokshi', in Gjakova.

=== International Poetry Meeting ===
Poets from Gjakova led by Din Mehmeti (1932–2010) organized the first Meeting of the Poetry in November 1964, on the City Park, where works were read by poets including Din Mehmeti, Enver Gjerqeku, Ali Olloni, and Ganimete Nura. This led to the creation of the literary club Gjon Nikolle Kazazi on the 19 April 1966. The club organized a wider gathering to be held annually on 9 May. The 1968 edition coincided with the 500th anniversary of the death of Gjergj Kastrioti-Skenderbeu, a national figure and subject of many Albanian poems. Since 1983, Gjon Nikolle Kazazi decided to give a prize for the best poem, first won by "Esad Mekuli".

The meeting was not held in 1989 due to cultural events being forbidden. During the years 1993–1995, the Meeting was displaced to Pristina, on the offices of the Kosovo Writers League, due to continued repression by Serbian institutions in Gjakova. The meeting returned to Gjakova from 1996 to 1997, but was suspended in 1998 due to war. Following the war, in 1999, the literary club resumed the meeting, held in the war ruins of Old Carshia in Gjakova.

In 2011, it was decided that the main prize would be named in memory of Din Mehmeti, who died the previous year. The Meeting still continues, and it is the only one of this kind in an Albanian-speaking territory. In 2013, the main prize was won by an Israeli poet. 2014 was its 50th jubilee anniversary.
