= Studentu paradīze =

Studentu Paradize ("Students' Paradise") is an event in the Baltic states celebrating the start of the new academic year. It is held at Arena Riga in Riga, Latvia and usually attracts a crowd of more than 10,000 current and prospective students. At this event students are able to attend several stages, where many different artists from Latvia and other countries perform. Over 25 entertainment stalls are provided by universities.

The project began in September 2007 and 2011 was the fifth consecutive year of the event. The aim is to promote unity among students and also to celebrate the school year opening for all students in Latvia. Twenty-five universities from all over the country are involved in the organization of the celebration.

== History ==
=== 2007 ===
The "Student’s paradise" event happened for the first time on 13 September 2007, by having 20 of Latvia’s largest universities join together. The event was attended by more than 5,000 students. It was divided in two parts, the first taking place in the day and second at night. During the day there was a public event in Esplanade, where students were able to attend informative stalls provided by the universities. The evening part happened in three different places at the same time – Sapnu Fabrika a.k.a. Heaven Disco (Tumsa, Gain Fast, Z-Scars, the host – Ufo performed there), La Rocca a.k.a. Club Disco and Students' Club a.k.a. Alternative Paradise (Dzelzs Vilks, Ghetoo Zloba and "Cilvēks ar putniņu" performed there). University rectors greeted the students.

"Students' Paradise 2007" got a prize from the Student Union of Latvia in the nomination "Debut of the Year", which demonstrated the project's significance in the students' cultural and recreational lives.

=== 2008 ===
In 2008 "Students' Paradise” took place on 18 September. The event was organized by 14 universities in Latvia and was attended by more than 10,000 students. This year "Students' Paradise" became the biggest school year opening celebration in the Baltic region in terms of the number of attendees. The event was opened by the former president of Latvia – Vaira Vīķe-Freiberga and rectors from universities in Latvia. In the event 15 different artists, Dj's and groups from Latvia, such as Tumsa, Labvēlīgais tips, Double Faced Eels, R.A.P., Ella, Dj Crash, Dj Gustavito, and Triānas parks, performed on three stages, but the host was Ufo. Students were able to attend entertainment stalls provided by universities.

"Students' Paradise" also had a pre-party, where teams from many universities in Latvia were competing in a rally with self-made machines. This was the year when the "Students' Paradise" anthem was made. The event was being broadcast in portals draugiem.lv and studentuparadize.lv.

=== 2009 ===
In 2009 the event happened on 25 September and it was organized by the 20 biggest universities in Latvia. The event in "Arena Riga" was attended by more than 10,000 both current and prospective students. On this year there were several stages – Main Floor, Love & Music Floor, Rock Floor and VIP Floor. Many artists performed such as Instrumenti, Instrumenti, Aisha, Ivo Fomins, PeR, Dzelzs Vilks, "Iedomu Spārni", "Dziļā Nemaņā", Crash, Gustavito, Kaspar Kondrat, Deros, and Roberts Lejasmeijers. Students were able to attend many party booths operated by the participating universities, colleges and academies. The event was opened by the rectors of universities and the Mayor of Riga, Nils Ušakovs and the Prime Minister of Latvia, Valdis Dombrovskis.

On September, before the event, there was also a pre-party and a Drift Party. The Drift Party was held next to the Olimpia shopping centre and student teams participated in car's pushing competition as well as watching drifters demonstrations.

=== 2010 ===
On 24 September 2010 "Students' Paradise" was attended by more than 11,000 students, which was a record in "Students' Paradise" history and other students' events in terms of the number of attendees! At the event 40 different artists performed from 7 countries all over the world on 9 stages. The host of the event was Māris Grigalis, and Dollarman (USA), GACHO, Musiqq, Aisha, Ēnas, Pienvedēja Piedzīvojumi, Seat Free, WILD, Droydi (Brazil), Gabbi Lopez (UK), Moses Malone (DK), Kaspars Zlidnis, and Dvīnes performed, as well as others. In the territory of "Arena Riga" were situated pools, where the Red Bull Bull Winch Session was located.

The event was opened this year by the vice-mayor of Riga, Ainārs Šlesers, rectors of universities, air acrobats and more than 40 dancers.
