= Duo Melis =

Duo Melis is a classical guitar duo consisting of Alexis Muzurakis and Susana Prieto.

== Reviews ==
Guitarists Alexis Muzurakis and Susana Prieto, the Duo Melis, have a stellar reputation in Europe and are beginning to extend their reach into North America. Their Bay Area debut… revealed an ensemble notable for sensitive musicianship, virtuosic panache, and stylish performances of music.

— Scott Cmiel (18 December 2007). "The Passion of the Guitar". San Francisco Classical Voice. San Francisco, California.

I heard [Duo Melis] just two summers ago at the Nurtingen Festival. I was amazed to see a young duo headlining an evening concert at that major festival, but more amazed to hear them. The ensemble was precise, the musicianship truly compelling.

— David Tanenbaum (8 July 2008). "The Upcoming GFA Festival". DavidTanenbaum.com.

Susana Prieto of Spain and Alexis Muzurakis of Greece have been performing internationally together since 1999 and been married since 1996. They bring to their music a remarkable like-minded sensibility, like hearing a single guitar being played by four sensitive, compassionate hands… But more than anything, it was the couple's astounding sense of intimate communication in the slower, more passionate passages that could almost make one weep. With their eyes closed and heads gently swaying, it was clear they were not just playing Granados' Valses Poeticos (Poetic Waltzes), they were dancing together, lost in their own world.

— Steve Siegel (7 June 2010). "Duo Melis show intimate communication in guitar festival concert". The Morning Call. Allentown, Pennsylvania.
