= Monaco Music Film Festival =

Annual film festival in Monte Carlo

The Monaco Music Film Festival is held annually in Monte Carlo. The first festival was held in 2006. The festivals mission is to celebrate film and the music of film. The festival focuses on the International and European premiers of feature films with a strong musical element. The 2007 festival will be held from May 17 to May 19.

== 2007 honouree ==
This year, the festival will be honouring Oscar-winning composer John Barry.

== 2007 film screenings ==
The 2007 festival will include the screening of six European Premier full-length feature films and one short.

Film	Director
Pete Seeger: The Power of Song	Jim Brown
Wonders Are Many	Jon Else
Opium & Milk	Joel Palumbo
About A Son	A.J. Schnack
Two Tickets to Paradise	D. B. Sweeney
Straight Outta Puerto Rico	Lee Savidge and James Chankin

== Other Monaco film festivals ==
The Monaco Music Film Festival is not affiliated with either the Monaco International Film Festival or the Monaco Charity Film Festival.
