= Southern Soul Festival =

Southern Soul Festival is a music festival held at Velika Plaža, a 12 km beach, in Ulcinj, Montenegro since 2013.

The festival features hip and underground names representing a broad selection of musical styles including soul, jazz, funk, house and disco. In 2015 it was chosen by The Guardian to be in their 10 of the best festivals in Europe list.

== Southern Soul Festival 2013 ==
The first Southern Soul Festival was held from 28 to 30 June 2013 at Docinium Kite Club in Velika Plaža, Ulcinj, and represented 3 days of music performances.

== Southern Soul Festival 2014 ==
In the same location as the first festival, the second one lasted for four days, from 26 to 29 June 2014.
