= List of festivals in the Isle of Man =

This is a list of notable festivals and events in the Isle of Man.

Festival	Occurrence	Description
Hop-tu-Naa	31 October, Annual	Celebration of the traditional Gaelic festival of Samhain, the start of winter. It is thought to be the oldest unbroken tradition in the Isle of Man.
Tourist Trophy (TT)	May and June, Annual	An annual motorcycle racing event
Mananan International Festivals	Throughout the year	A set of cultural events, including the Mananan International Festival, the Opera Festival, the Oboe Festival and the Viola Festival.
Mananan International Festival	Annual, June	The namesake of the Mananan International Festivals. A multiday music festival celebrating international genres and styles.
Isle of Man Literature Festival	September, Annual	A literature festival centered around Manx culture and local writers.
