= PitchWise Festival =

Annual feminist festival in Sarajevo, Bosnia

- Status: active
- Genre: Art festival
- Location: Sarajevo
- Country: Bosnia and Herzegovina
- Years active: 2005 - present
- Website: www.fondacijacure.org

The PitchWise Festival of Women’s Art and Activism is an annual feminist festival held in Sarajevo, Bosnia and Herzegovina, organized by the CURE Foundation since 2005. The festival combines artistic expression with activism, providing a platform for women and marginalized groups to engage in dialogue, share experiences, and promote social change through various forms of art and public discourse.

== History ==
The inaugural PitchWise Festival took place in September 2005, initiated by activists from the CURE Foundation. The festival was conceived as a response to the lack of spaces dedicated to feminist art and activism in Bosnia and Herzegovina. By occupying and transforming neglected public spaces, such as the Historical Museum of Bosnia and Herzegovina, the festival aimed to create inclusive environments for socially engaged artists, activists, and theorists.

Over the years, PitchWise has grown into an international event, attracting participants from across the former Yugoslavia and the world. The festival has hosted over 5,000 socially engaged artists, activists, and feminists, fostering a network of individuals committed to gender equality and social justice.

== Format and Activities ==
Held annually over four days in September, the PitchWise Festival features a diverse program that includes:

- Workshops: Covering topics such as self-defense, mental health, and creative arts.
- Panel Discussions: Addressing issues like gender-based violence, women's rights, and feminist movements.
- Art Exhibitions: Showcasing works by female artists and collectives.
- Film Screenings: Presenting documentaries and films that highlight women's experiences.
- Performances: Including theatre, music, and dance performances with feminist themes.
- Public Actions: Engaging the community through street performances and interactive installations.

The festival is known for its inclusive approach, welcoming participants of all ages, backgrounds, and identities. It serves as a safe space for dialogue, healing, and empowerment, particularly for marginalized groups such as Roma women, LGBTQ+ individuals, and survivors of war and violence.

== Concepts and Objectives ==
2012 edition of the PitchWise Festival.

PitchWise operates on the belief that art can be a powerful tool for social transformation. The festival's objectives include:

- Promoting feminist ideas and policies.
- Encouraging young women to engage in activism and the women's movement.
- Creating new avenues for action through dialogue and initiatives led by women with diverse experiences.
- Challenging patriarchal norms and advocating for gender equality.

The festival also emphasizes the importance of occupying public spaces to assert women's presence and voices in society. By transforming these spaces into hubs of feminist activity, PitchWise seeks to disrupt traditional narratives and promote a culture of inclusivity and resistance.

== Locations ==
While the festival's primary venue is the Historical Museum of Bosnia and Herzegovina in Sarajevo, events are also held in various public spaces throughout the city. These locations are chosen to maximize accessibility and visibility, reinforcing the festival's commitment to community engagement and public discourse.

== Gallery ==
Organisational committee, 13 September 2006.

PitchWise event, 10 September 2022.
