= Menningarnótt =

Annual Icelandic event

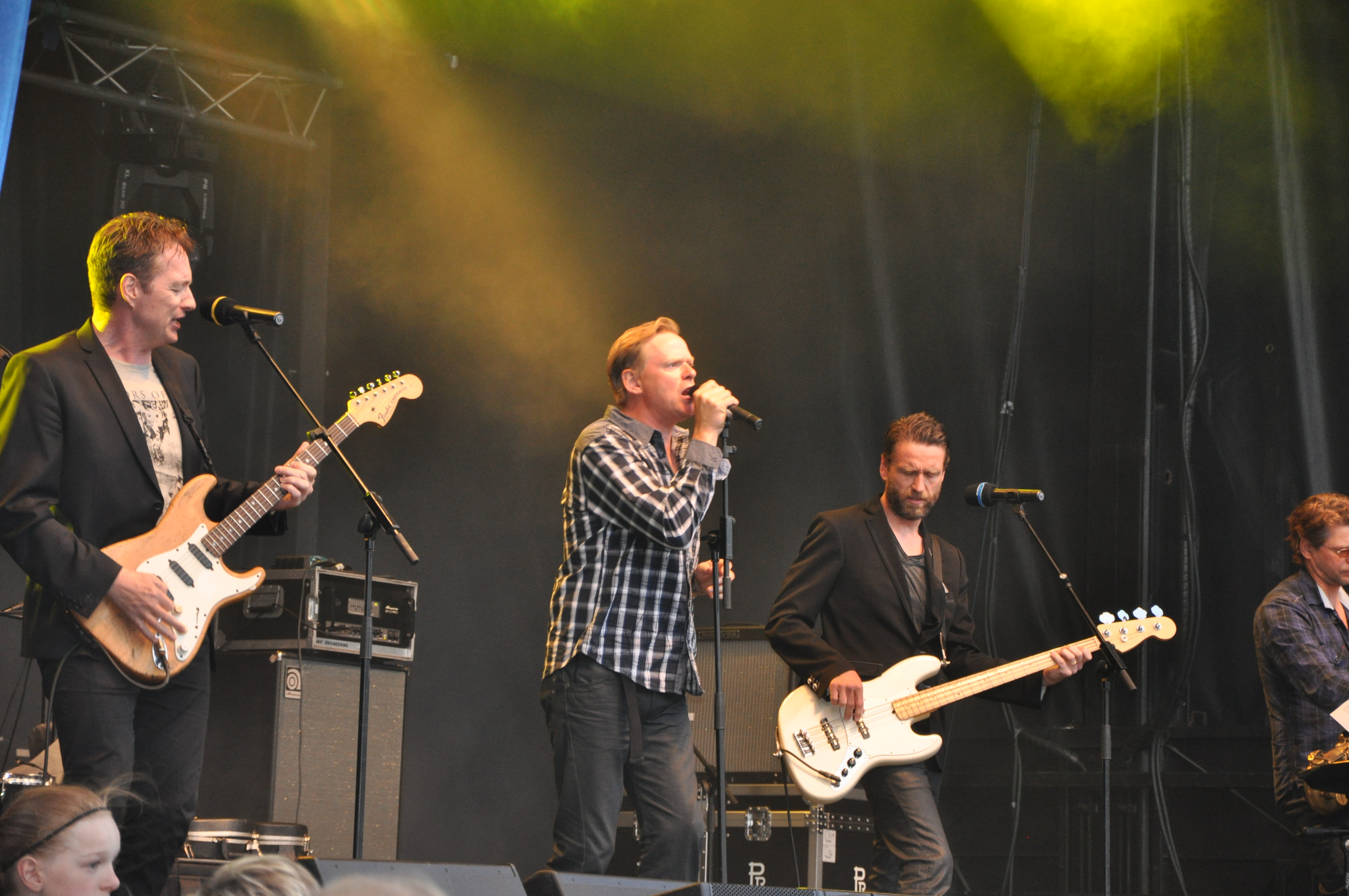
Stefán Hilmarsson during a concert at Menningarnótt

Menningarnótt (Icelandic pronunciation: [ˈmɛnːiŋkarˌnouht]) or "cultural night" is a yearly event held in Reykjavík, the capital of Iceland, since 1996. It is usually on the first Saturday after the 18th of August. It was created by the Reykjavík city council, and has now become one of the largest festivals in Iceland, rivalling the celebration of Iceland's national day on June 17.

It is estimated that as many as 100,000 people attend the annual concerts and festivities conducted in central Reykjavík, a staggeringly high percentage of Iceland's total population of 315,000 and Reykjavík's population of nearly 118,000 (203,000 in the Capital Region).

The festival often consists of a main stage in the city centre and many smaller events mostly in the city's centre but also spread over the city. The highlight of the festival is often an outside concert on the main stage by 3–4 of the most popular musicians in Iceland followed by a rather glamorous fireworks show.
