= LOW Festival =

2008 cultural festival in Hungary

The LOW Festival (also known as LOW Holland-Flamand Kultfeszt) was a multidisciplinary contemporary cultural festival held in Hungary in the cities Budapest and Pécs from 15 February till 12 March 2008. The name of the festival alludes to the Low Countries, the region encompassing the Netherlands and Flanders.

The aim of the festival was to get the Hungarian audience acquainted with contemporary Dutch and Flemish culture. Besides this the festival's goal was to establish a sustainable cooperation between Dutch, Flemish and Hungarian organisations and artists. The LOW Festival brought a wide variety of Dutch and Flemish visual arts, design, performing arts, feature films, documentaries, contemporary, classical, jazz and pop music to Hungary.

The LOW Festival was initiated by the Royal Netherlands Embassy and the Flemish Representation in Budapest, the organizational tasks were carried out by the Low Festival Centre, which was opened by the Hungarian Minister of Foreign Affairs, Kinga Göncz, and her Dutch colleague, Maxime Verhagen, in a ceremony on September 12, 2007.

== Location ==
The festival took place at more than 20 locations in Budapest, including popular venues like the A38 Ship, Ernst Museum, Ludwig Museum, Merlin Theatre, Millenáris Park, MU Theatre, Műcsarnok/Kunsthalle, Örökmozgó Filmmuseum, Palace of Arts, Rudas Bath and Trafó – House of Contemporary Arts.
