= Anthesphoria =

The Anthesphoria was one of the religious festivals held in Ancient Greece in honor of Persephone's return from the Underworld. According to mythological tradition, Persephone's husband, Hades, tricked her into eating four pomegranate seeds when Zeus ordered him to let her return to her mother after he had kidnapped her. Because she ate the seeds, Persephone was then forced to spend one-third of the year in the Underworld and only allotted two-thirds of the year aboveground. This festival was held in Sicily and several other regions throughout the ancient world, with each one having distinct customs and rituals.
