= VideoDance Festival, Greece =

Coordinates: 40°38′N 22°56′E

VideoDance Festival
- Location: Athens and Thessaloniki
- Established: 2000

VideoDance Festival started in 2000 in Athens and Thessaloniki as an international dance film festival, but soon it widened to include more kinds of experiment on movement and the moving image. The festival has counted 7 editions from 2000 to 2007 (not held in 2006).

== About VideoDance Festival ==
VideoDance was a festival presenting the latest experiments on media and movement or, in other words, at the crossroads of visual arts, enhanced cinema and performing arts.

The screenings, the main festival axis, present a showcase of films from all over the world presented in thematic programmes. Non-narrative experimental films are being screened along with movement-based films.

As far as it concerns dance films, programming is focused on the special relationship between movement and the moving image, both when it is produced as a result of a choreography for the camera, and when it is produced by the filmmaker's look on the movement.

Special screenings present archival material on the history of movement and the moving image as it is preserved on film during the 20th century. Retrospectives like those on the works by Maya Deren (2003), Shirley Clarke (2004), or Ed Emshwiller give the Greek audience an opportunity to contact the first attempts of the experimental non-narrative cinema to use the movement as its main source.

The live media events zone includes video-performances, performances, live improvisation with sound and image, and other experimental art works involving media and performing arts.

During the festival video-installations related to the film programme themes are exhibited.

The festival takes place in Athens, and the film programme is screened in Thessaloniki right after that.

== More about VideoDance Festival ==
Video Dance was funded and produced since 2000 by the International Thessaloniki Film Festival, one of the major film institutions in Greece, part of the Greek Ministry of Culture. It was founded and curated by its artistic director, Christiana Galanopoulou. The festival was non competitive and non-commercial. However, it supported and encouraged the production of dance films in Greece, through a funding scheme, project|exchange. 12 Greek dance films have been co-produced by VideoDance through this scheme. The festival collaborated with several international dance film and film festivals, archives and cultural institutions and was a founding member of the Dance and Media Festivals International Network. The festival was held in industrial spaces especially re-designed for VideoDance by young architects. The last edition, VideoDance2007, was held in Athens and Thessaloniki in May 2007.

== See also ==
- International Thessaloniki Film Festival
- Thessaloniki Documentary Festival
- MIRfestival www.mirfestival.gr
