= Sarajevo Irish Festival =

Annual cultural event

- Genre: Cultural festival
- Frequency: Annual/Ad hoc
- Locations: Sarajevo, Bosnia and Herzegovina
- Years active: 2015 – current
- Founders: Garret Patrick Kelly, Nerma Sofić
- Participants: 10-50
- Attendance: 50 to 500
- Area: Bosnia and Herzegovina

The Sarajevo Irish Festival (Bosnian: Sarajevski irski festival / Сарајевски ирски фестивал) is an artists and organisers collective which runs or co-organizes cultural events in Sarajevo, Bosnia and Herzegovina, that celebrate Irish culture. The festival was established in 2015 and was originally held over three days around and including St. Patrick's Day but now organizes events on an ad hoc basis. It was conceived of by founder Garret Patrick Kelly, and co founder Nerma Sofić, originally in cooperation with the Embassy of Ireland, Slovenia (Ljubljana) - before the Embassy of Ireland, Bosnia and Herzegovina was opened in Sarajevo - and Culture Ireland. The festival has hosted Irish theatre companies, screened Irish films, and organised concerts of Irish folk musicians. The festival has hosted or supported visits by numerous Irish artists, filmmakers, writers, theatre directors, actors and musicians - sometimes in cooperation with other festivals such as the Sarajevo Film Festival and Bookstan - including: Howie B (aka Howard Simon Bernstein) Stephen Burke, Panti Bliss (aka Rory O'Neill), Saara Chaudry, Catriona Crowe, Liam Cunningham Anita Doron, Zlata Filipović Conor Horgan, Dragana Jurišić, Niamh McCormack, Phillip McMahon, Priscilla Morris, Deirdre Mulroony, Ailís Ní Ríain, Guggi(aka Derek Rowen), Conor Quinlan, Niall Sweeney, Ian Thuillier, Colm Tóibín and others.
