= Riga Salsa Festival =

Annual dancing event in Riga, Latvia

- Location: Riga
- Country: Latvia
- Inaugurated: 2005
- Website: www.everfest.com/e/rigas-salsas-festivals-riga-latvia

Riga Salsa Festival is an annual dancing event that takes place in Riga, Latvia. The event has become one of the most important salsa events in the Baltic Countries and many salsa fans from abroad also come to participate.

The festival originated in 2005 and features live performances from salsa artists, workshops and salsa masterclasses as well as a salsa ball.

The sixth annual festival took place in Riga from 11 to 13 June 2010 and featured international salsa dancers from countries such as Spain and Portugal.
