= Demofest =

Music festival in Bosnia and Herzegovina

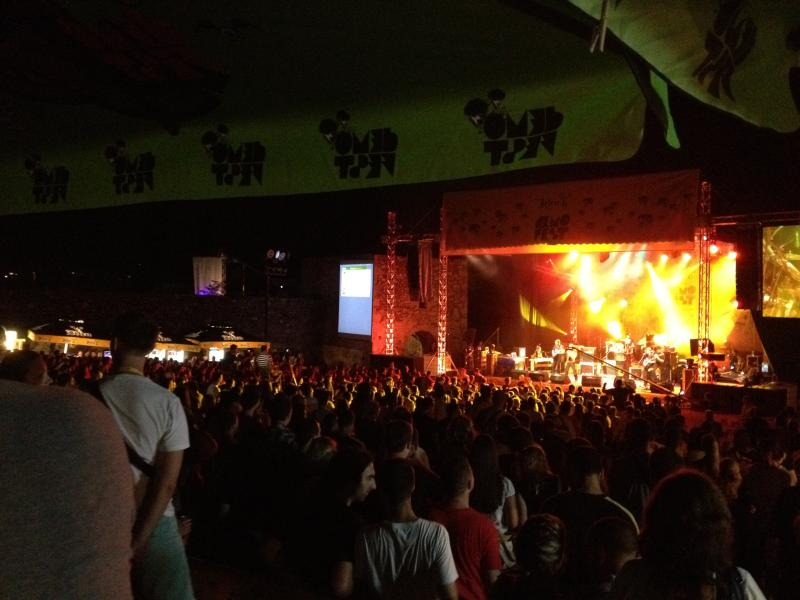
- Demofest 2012
- Genre: Rock, Punk, Metal, Hip hop, Reggae
- Dates: Three days in July
- Locations: Kastel Fortress, Banja Luka, Bosnia and Herzegovina
- Years active: 2008–present
- Website: demofest.org

Demofest is an annual music festival held at the Kastel Fortress in Banja Luka, the second largest city in Bosnia and Herzegovina. It was founded in 2008 with the aim to provide young unsigned bands with an opportunity to develop and revive the rock scene of former Yugoslavia. Today, it is the biggest festival of unsigned bands in Southeastern Europe and one of the biggest festivals in this region.

Demofest consists of competitive and non-competitive program. Competition is open to all unsigned rock, punk, pop, metal, hip hop or reggae bands originating from Bosnia and Herzegovina, Slovenia, Croatia, Serbia, Montenegro or North Macedonia. Regional and world music stars are featured in non-competitive program and some of the biggest hosted names include Guano Apes, Kosheen, Gentleman, Stereo MCs, Kelis, Fun Lovin’ Criminals, Triggerfinger, Asian Dub Foundation, Kiril Džajkovski, Dubioza kolektiv, Majke, Psihomodo pop, Damir Urban, S.A.R.S and Partibrejkers.

From 2008 to 2018, over 4,000 unsigned bands applied for the competition and 61 performers played in the non-competitive program.

In 2010, Demofest was included on UNESCO list of projects contributing to cultural rapprochement and establishing ties between countries of former Yugoslavia. It was supported by international institutions on several occasions, while all relevant regional media and numerous world media such as The Guardian, Vice or MTV reported on the festival. This music event was also featured in the film "Zduhač Means Adventure", whose plot follows several characters on their journey to Demofest.

== Concept of the Festival ==
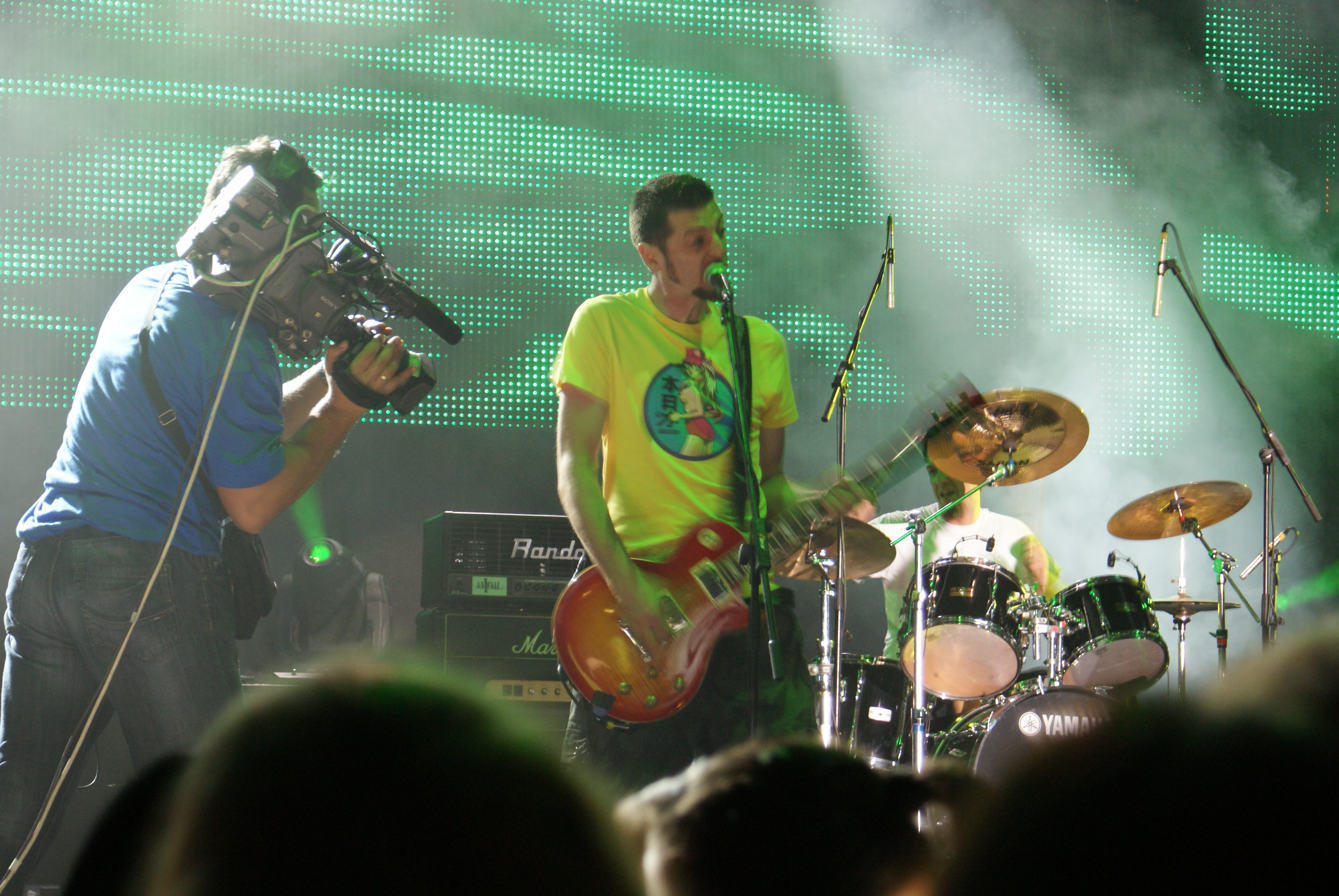
Demofest 2011

The call for applications for participation in the competition opens in the spring of every year. Applicants send their demo recordings along with the application documents and approximately 30 of them are granted with the opportunity to perform at the festival. The winning band is awarded with the recording and production of both their album and a music video. Second placed and third placed bands are awarded with stage equipment. In addition to these, various other awards are regularly handed out.

Contestants, finalists and winners of the main awards are all selected by the jury consisting of different members each year. Apart from representatives of Demofest and festival sponsors, the jury is composed of famous regional musicians, rock critics, music journalists and producers. Some of the previous jury members were Rambo Amadeus, Davor Gobac, Elvir Laković Laka, Vlatko Stefanovski, Marko Šelić Marčelo, Vasil Hadžimanov, Nikola Vranjković, Milorad Milinković, Petar Janjatović and Branimir Lokner.

Since 2011, festival lasts for three days. Headliners perform after contestants and each year there is an accompanying day program, featuring graffiti and comic workshops, photography and painting exhibitions, film projections, book promotions, various music events and numerous workshops, trainings and lectures for the musicians.

== History ==
=== 2008 ===
First edition of the festival was the longest one and it took place from July 19 to July 26. 192 unsigned bands applied and 32 performed in the competition. Only this year contestants played two songs, while headliners performed between the competition nights.

The winning band was KillingJazzHardCoreBaby (Travnik, BiH), second placed was Tripcycle (Novi Sad, Serbia) and third placed was Magma (Belgrade, Serbia). Audience Award and Journalists Award were also handed out.

Headliners were KUD Idijoti, Marčelo & Filter Crew, Urban & 4, Darko Rundek & Kargo Orkestar and Vlatko Stefanovski Trio.

The day program featured graffiti workshops, photography exhibitions, movie projections, trainings for musicians and panel discussions.

=== 2009 ===
Second edition of the festival took place from July 23 to July 27. 304 unsigned bands applied and 33 performed in the competition. For the first time, globally popular musicians and winners from the previous year were included in non-competitive program, which became the standard in the following years.

Winning band was Prophaganda (Zagreb, Croatia), second placed was Discopath (Split, Croatia) and third place was shared between ZAA (Kruševac, Serbia) and Tanker (Banja Luka, BiH). Audience Award and Journalists Award were also handed out.

Headliners were Kosheen, Asian Dub Foundation, Therapy?, Nouvelle Vague, KillingJazzHardcoreBaby, Tripcycle and Magma.

The day program featured photography exhibitions, film projections, trainings for musicians and music events.

=== 2010 ===
Third edition of the festival took place from July 21 to July 24. 370 unsigned bands applied and 34 performed in the competition.

Winning band was Threesome (Belgrade, Serbia), second placed was Kuriri (Pirot, Serbia) and third placed was Prežderani (Daruvar, Hrvatska). Audience Award was also handed out.

Headliners were Stereo MCs, Kiril Džajkovski, New Young Pony Club, Fun Lovin' Criminals, Prophaganda, Discopath, ZAA and Tanker.

The day program featured illustrations exhibitions, film projections, trainings for musicians and music events.

=== 2011 ===
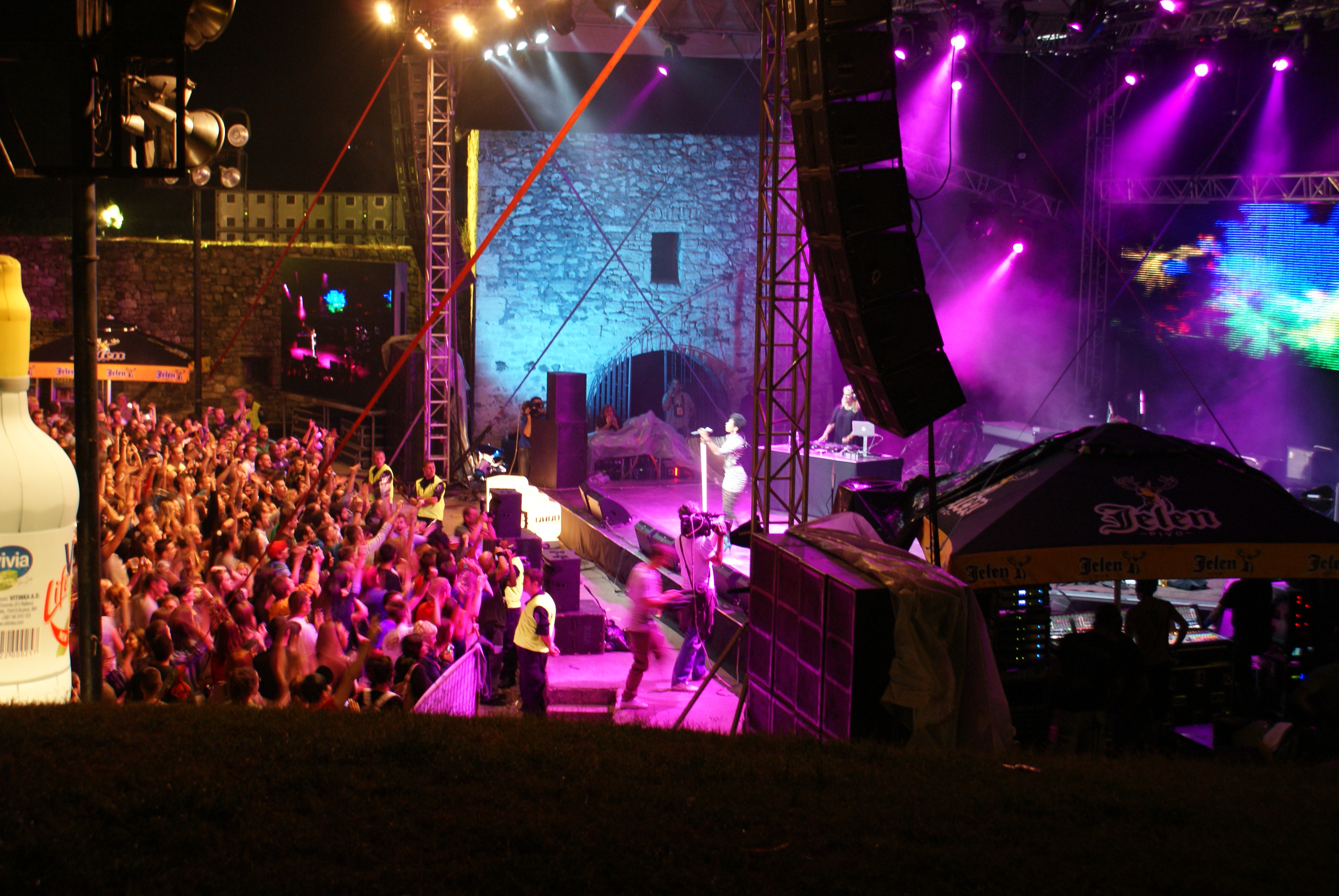
Demofest 2011

Fourth edition of the festival took place from July 27 to July 29 . 438 unsigned bands applied and 24 performed in the competition.

Winning band was Plišani mališan (Gornji Milanovac, Serbia), second placed was Big Bug (Pirot, Serbia) and third placed was Aesthetic Empathy (Sarajevo, BiH). Fourth placed bands were also awarded and Most Promising Banja Luka Band award was introduced.

Headliners were Kelis, Skindred, Tricky, Threesome, Kuriri and Prežderani.

The day program featured comic workshops, book promotions, trainings for musicians of books and music events.

=== 2012 ===
Due to the lack of financial support, organizers initially canceled the fifth edition of the festival. However, in the early 2012, several young individuals from Banja Luka started a campaign for survival of the festival, aimed at securing financial aid for Demofest from the Government of Republic of Srpska. The campaign became widespread very quickly, receiving support throughout BiH and neighbouring countries. After the petition with 3,500 signatures was submitted, relevant authorities granted the needed funds. Festival took place from July 26 to July 28. 395 unsigned bands applied and 30 performed in the competition.

Winning band was Neuro (Banja Luka, BiH), second placed was Kraj programa (Rijeka, Croatia) and third placed was Dede Putra (Bihać, BiH). Most Promising Banja Luka Band award was handed out, as well as the special Organization Award and Best Journalist Award. Blue Bass award for the best bass player was also introduced in the memory of the late Banja Luka musician Igor Kašiković Kale, who used to play a blue colored bass guitar.

Headliners were Majke, Zemlja gruva, Darkwood Dub & Bisera Veletanlić, T.B.F., Psihomodo pop, Sopot, Plišani mališan, Big Bug and Aesthetic Empathy.

The day program featured comic workshops, photography exhibitions, movie projections and music events.

=== 2013 ===
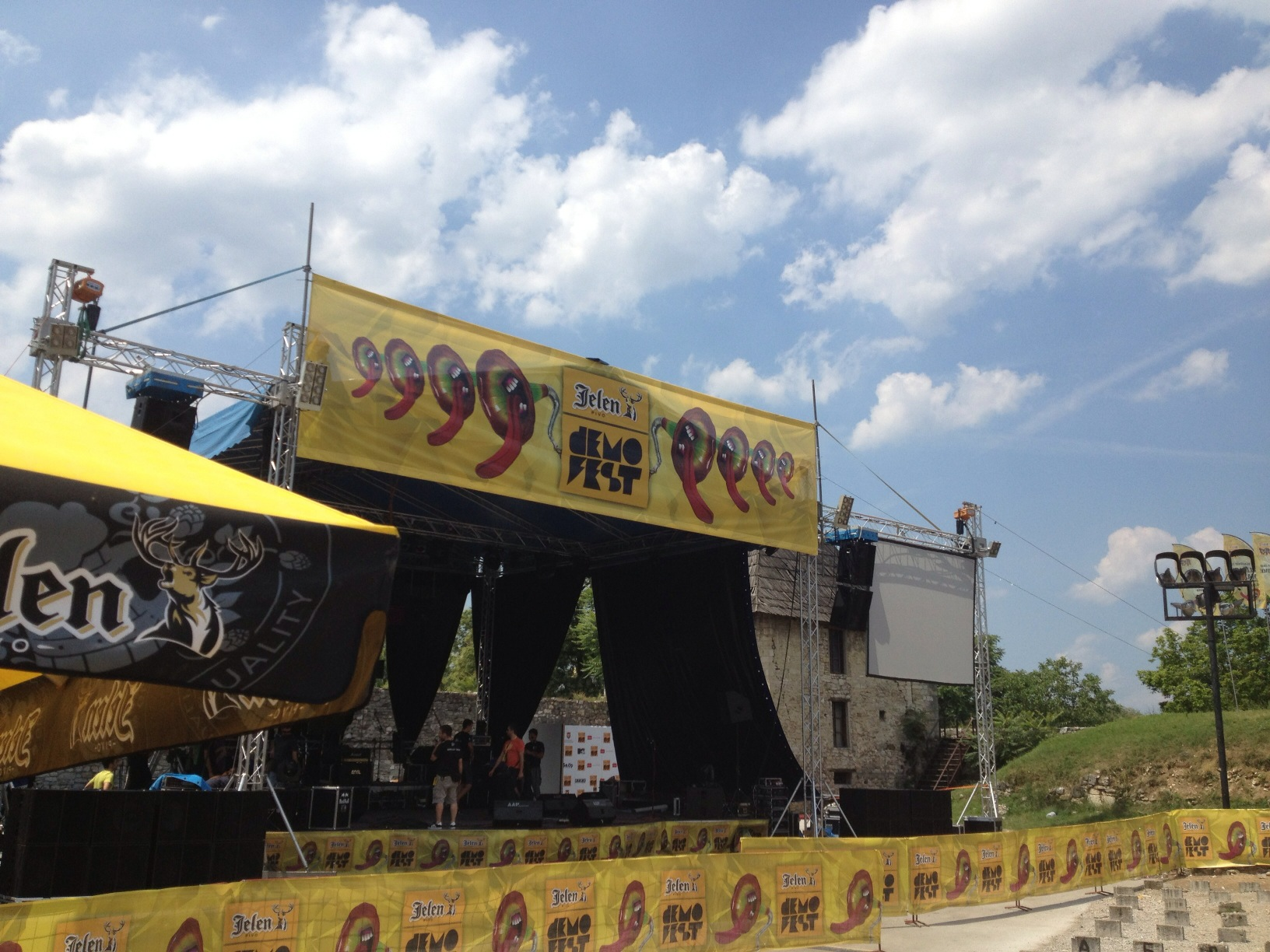
Stage for Demofest 2013

Sixth edition of the festival took place from July 18 to July 20. 428 unsigned bands applied and 30 performed in the competition. More than 10,000 visitors attended the opening night, setting the record at the time.

Winning band was M.O.R.T (Sinj, Hrvatska), second placed was Kontradikshn (Brežice, Slovenia) and third placed was SmokeShakers (Kavadarci, Macedonia). Most Promising Banja Luka Band, Blue Bass, Best Drummer and Best Journalist awards were also handed out.

Headliners were Dubioza kolektiv, S.A.R.S., Partibrejkers, Superhiks, Kiril Džajkovski, Plejboj, Neuro and Dede Putra.

The day program featured comic workshops, unique products market, trainings for musicians, music events and an exhibition of Davor Gobac's paintings.

=== 2014 ===
Seventh edition of the festival took place from July 17 to July 19. 458 unsigned bands applied and 30 performed in the competition. After a three-year break, globally popular acts headlined Demofest again.

Winning band was Hulahoop (Kamnik, Slovenia), second placed was Punkart (Tuzla, BiH) and third placed was Low Peak Charlie (Primorska / Ljubljana, Slovenia). A record number of awards was handed out: Most Promising Banja Luka Band, Blue Bass, Best Drummer, Best Guitar Player, Best Placed Contestant From Banja Luka and Best Journalist.

Headliners were Guano Apes, Max Romeo, Brand New Heavies, Hladno pivo, Eyesburn, Urban & 4, M.O.R.T., Kontradikshn and SmokeShakers.

The day program featured comic workshops, photography exhibitions, trainings for musicians and music events.

=== 2015 ===
Eight edition of the festival took place from July 16 to July 18. 461 unsigned bands applied and 31 performed in the competition. For the first time, Demofest stage was not located on Kastel summer stage, due to its reconstruction, but in the other, more spacious area of Kastel Fortress.

Winning band was Nord (Rijeka, Croatia), second placed was Rezerve (Tučepi, Croatia) and third placed was S.K.A. (Leskovac, Serbia). Audience Award was also handed out, as well as Blue Bass, Best Guitar Player and Best Journalist awards.

Headliners were Gentleman, Triggerfinger, M.O.R.T., Who See, T.B.F., Irie FM, Hulahoop, Punkart and Low Peak Charlie. Initially, it was announced that Eagles of Death Metal will also headline Demofest, but one week before the festival the band canceled last three shows of their 2015 summer tour (Greece, Hungary and BiH), citing "economic situation in Greece" as the main reason.

The day program featured photography exhibitions, unique products market, Human Library, film projections, book promotions and music events.

=== 2016 ===
Ninth edition of the festival took place from July 21 to July 23. Total of 467 unsigned bands applied for the competition and 33 of them performed. Demofest 09 recorded the highest attendance since its debut with over 30,000 visitors attending the event during three festival days.

Winning band was Seine (Varaždin/Zagreb, Croatia), second placed was Degeneza (Belgrade, Serbia) and third placed was Letarg (Koprivnica, Croatia). Additional awards that were handed out were Blue Bass, Best Guitar Player and Best Journalist.

Headliners were Mando Diao, The Sisters of Mercy, Dub Pistols, Hladno pivo, Kolja i Grobovlasnici, Bombaj štampa, ZAA, Nord, Rezerve and S.K.A.

The day program featured exhibitions of photographs and music artifacts, percussion workshops, film projections, trainings for musicians and music events.

=== 2017 ===
Tenth edition of the festival took place from July 20 to July 23. Total of 471 unsigned bands applied for the competition, setting the new festival record, and 49 of them performed. Demofest 10 was the largest festival format with two stages.

Winning band was Slonz (Šabac, Serbia), second placed was Tyger Lamb (Zagreb, Croatia) and third placed was Wolfram (Novi Sad, Serbia). Additional awards that were handed out were Blue Bass and Best Guitar Player.

Headliners were Rudimental (DJ Set), Marky Ramone, Freemasons, Ky-Mani Marley, Funkerman, Dubioza kolektiv, Edo Maajka, Lačni Franc, Bad Copy, Sopot, Seine, Degeneza and Letarg.

The day program featured exhibitions of photographs and illustrations, round table "Women in Art", eco competition "Pure Art", book promotions and music events.

=== 2018 ===
Eleventh edition of the festival took place from July 19 to July 22. Total of 458 unsigned bands applied for competition and 26 of them performed.

Winning band was Sergio Lounge (Belgrade, Serbia), second placed was Vin Triste (Belgrade, Serbia) and third placed was Fire in Cairo (Zagreb, Croatia). Additional awards that were handed out were Blue Bass and Best Guitar Player.

Headliners were Magnifico and The Serbian Army Orchestra, Dječaci, Marko Louis, Darko Rundek & Ekipa, Nele Karajlić and All Star band, Goblini, Slonz, Tyger Lamb and Wolfram.

The day program featured exhibitions of photographs, film projections, various workshops and music events.

== Awards and Acknowledgements ==
Year	First place	Second place	Third place	Other Awards
2008	KillingJazzHardcoreBaby	Tripcycle	Magma	Audience Award: Grof Đuraz Journalists Award: Catrin Noise
2009	Prophaganda	Discopath	ZAA / Tanker	Audience Award: Orion Journalistis Award: Prophaganda
2010	Threesome	Kuriri	Prežderani	Audience Award: Kteri
2011	Plišani mališan	Big Bug	Aesthetic Empathy	Fourth Place: Nova, Bitipatibi, The Schtrebers, Indigo Pop Most Promising Banja Luka Band: Tanker
2012	Neuro	Kraj programa	Dede Putra	Organization Award: Vila Filozofina Most Promising Banja Luka Band: Deer in the Headlights / Aurora Blue Bass: Nemanja Ristović Best Journalist: Branka Glavonjić
2013	M.O.R.T.	Kontradikshn	SmokeShakers	Most Promising Banja Luka Band: Važno obavještenje Blue Bass: Matija Jašarov Best Drummer: Gregor Hodinj Best Journalist: Savo Drakulić
2014	Hulahoop	Punkart	Low Peak Charlie	Audience Award: Benefit Most Promising Banja Luka Band: Brutal Protest Best Placed Contestant From Banja Luka: Shanghai Street Fight Blue Bass: Lovro Velušček Best Drummer: Luka Žižić Best Guitar Player: Marko Bagarić Best Journalist: Haris Suljović
2015	Nord	Rezerve	S.K.A.	Audience Award: Cardinal Point Blue Bass: Mihael Prosen Best Guitar Player: Ante Puharić Best Journalist: Zoran Tučkar
2016	Seine	Degeneza	Letarg	Blue Bass: Maja Kolarić Best Guitar Player: David Seferović Best Journalist: Mirna Pijetlović
2017	Slonz	Tyger Lamb	Wolfram	Blue Bass: Adrijan Jung Best Guitar Player: Nikola Mijaiolić
2018	Sergio Lounge	Vin Triste	Fire in Cairo	Blue Bass: Jovan Đukić Best Guitar Player: Pavle Popov

== Headliners ==
Year	Headliners
2008	KUD Idijoti, Marčelo & Filter Crew, Urban & 4, Darko Rundek & Kargo Orkestar, Vlatko Stefanovski Trio
2009	Kosheen, Asian Dub Foundation, Nouvelle Vague, Therapy? KillingJazzHardcoreBaby, Tripcycle, Magma
2010	Stereo MCs, Fun Lovin' Criminals, Kiril Džajkovski, New Young Pony Club Prophaganda, Discopath, ZAA, Tanker
2011	Kelis, Skindred, Tricky Threesome, Kuriri, Prežderani
2012	Majke, Psihomodo pop, Zemlja gruva, Darkwood Dub & Bisera Veletanlić, Sopot, T.B.F. Plišani mališan, Big Bug, Aesthetic Empathy
2013	Dubioza kolektiv, Kiril Džajkovski, S.A.R.S., Partibrejkers, Plejboj, Superhiks Neuro, Dede Putra
2014	Guano Apes, Max Romeo, Brand New Heavies, Urban & 4, Hladno pivo, Eyesburn M.O.R.T., Kontradikshn, SmokeShakers
2015	Gentleman, Triggerfinger, T.B.F., Who See, Irie FM, M.O.R.T. Hulahoop, Punkart, Low Peak Charlie
2016	Mando Diao, The Sisters of Mercy, Dub Pistols, Hladno pivo, Kolja i Grobovlasnici, Bombaj štampa, ZAA Nord, Rezerve, S.K.A.
2017	Rudimental (DJ Set), Marky Ramone, Freemasons, Ky-Mani Marley, Funkerman, Dubioza kolektiv, Edo Maajka, Lačni Franc, Bad Copy, Sopot, Seine, Degeneza, Letarg
2018	Magnifico and The Serbian Army Orchestra, Dječaci, Marko Louis, Darko Rundek & Ekipa, Nele Karajlić and All Star band, Goblini, Slonz, Tyger Lamb, Wolfram
