= Spiritus Progenitum =

- Status: inactive
- Genre: Art festival, literary festival
- Location: Sarajevo
- Country: Bosnia and Herzegovina
- Years active: 2013 - 2017

Spiritus Progenitum was an international humanitarian arts and literary festival held in Sarajevo, Bosnia and Herzegovina between 2013 and 2017. It exclusively showcased art and literature from the Former Yugoslavia.
