= Golden Fairy Festival =

- Genre: Choir music
- Dates: May
- Locations: Prijedor, Bosnia and Herzegovina
- Years active: 2001 – present
- Website: www.zlatnavila.info

The Golden Fairy Festival (Serbian Cyrillic: Међународни фестивал Златна вила) is an international multi-day choir music festival which annually takes place in Prijedor, Republika Srpska, Bosnia and Herzegovina. It was established in 2001 by the Prosvjeta institute in cooperation with the VILA choir society.

== History ==
Prijedor has historically been a hub for church choir music in Bosnia and Herzegovina, with over 20 choir societies being active in the period leading up to the Second World War. The largest of said societies was the Serbian Orthodox VILA choir society, which was founded in 1885 with the goal of promoting Serbian spiritual music. It was banned by the Independent State of Croatia in 1941 and was not reestablished by the communist authorities after the war. The tradition of choir music in Prijedor was secularized and reorganized in SFR Yugoslavia with the creation of numerous art and culture societies of which the most prominent was SKUD Dr. Mladen Stojanović, named after Bosnian physician, partisan and People's Hero of Yugoslavia, Mladen Stojanović. It was, at the time, the legal successor of VILA. In 2000 the VILA choir society was reestablished and quickly went on to found the Golden Fairy Festival in cooperation with Prosvjeta, under the name Prijedor Choir Ceremony (Serbian Cyrillic: Приједорске хорске свечаности). In 2003 the festival was given its current name. It hosts 10 to 15 international choirs per edition.
