= Balkan Photo Festival =

Annual photography festival held in Sarajevo, Bosnia and Herzegovina

- Genre: Photography festival
- Date: January
- Frequency: annual
- Location: Sarajevo
- Years active: 2010 - 2018
- Founder: Urban Foundation
- Area: worldwide
- Organiser: Urban Foundation
- Website: balkanphotofest.com

Balkan Photo Festival was an annual photography festival held in Sarajevo, Bosnia and Herzegovina. It is held in January of every year and is the legal successor of the now-defunct Festival of Bosnian Photography. The festival was established in 2010 by the Urban Foundation in cooperation with the Association of Professional Photographers of Bosnia and Herzegovina and the online photography journal fotografija.ba. The 2011 edition was the first to be internationalized. Balkan Photo Festival is the largest photography festival in the Balkans, receiving more than 5,000 submissions annually.

== Format ==
The festival is composed of three main programs: competition, education and networking. The competition program is further composed of 11 categories out of which 11 eventual winners are chosen. The 11 categories are as follows: Nudity, Fashion, Cultural Heritage, Mobile Phone, Sports and Leisure, Portrait, Abstract, Nature and Landscapes, News and Politics, Press. Submissions for the competition program are accepted from the beginning of December with the final selection being made during the first week of January. The festival is opened on the last Monday of January with a large festival-long exhibition of all the photographs selected for the competition program. A panel made up of eminent international photographers judges the entries and decides on the winners. The winners receive the Balkan Photo Award in their category. The education program kicks off after the festival opening and is made up of lectures and workshops organized in numerous venues across the city. The networking program, which is of an informal nature, includes round table discussions, tours of the city called photo safaris, interactive café lectures and concerts. The 2017 edition established the Justice for Every Child program in cooperation with UNICEF.

== The Balkan Photo Award winners ==
Selected winners:

=== 2010 ===
- Jury: Haris Pašović, Aida Begić, Elmir Jukić, Želimir Žilnik
- Photo of the year: Roda i mjesec by Andrija Vrdoljak
- Sarajevo category: Vječni plamen by Edin Gačan
- Nature category: One Tree by Amir Kehić
- Urban category: Epic by Dejan Vladić
- Report category: Pad vlade by Dado Ruvić
- Best photo selected by f.ba: Vrijeme po mom satu by Dolores Juhas

=== 2011 ===
- Jury: Bevis Fusha, Denis Curti, Branislav Brkić, Marc Prust, Mario Periša, Zijah Gafić
- Press category: Nasilje nad Romima by Midhat Poturović
- City category: Ljubav by Miljan Šućur
- People category: Maršal by Kristijan Antolović
- Nature category: Šuma koja nestaje by Zvonimir Barišin
- Abstract/Creative category: Praha by Roberto Pavić
- Best photo selected by f.ba: Život ide dalje by Denis Švrakić

=== 2012 ===
- Jury: Bevis Fusha, Branislav Brkić, Marc Prust, Mario Periša, Zijah Gafić
- Press category: Rudari by Midhat Poturović
- City category: Lekina bara by Marko Stamatović
- People category: Come Back by Goran Bisić
- Nature category: Dolazak proljeća by Denis Ruvić
- Abstract/Creative category: Twisted by Filip Gržinčić

=== 2013 ===
- Jury: Regina Azenberger, Dražen Stojčić, Mladin Pikulić, Mario Romulić, Amer Kapetanović, Jan Vermer, Marko Risović
- Press category: JMBG protesti by Sulejman Omerbašić
- City category: Buđenje novog dana by Edin Džeko
- People category: Pogled by Siniša Plavšić
- Nature category: Jesenjski vjetar by Dino Šimek
- Abstract/Creative category: Dubioza Kolektiv by Goran Lizdek

=== 2014 ===
- Jury: Andrew Testa, Dženat Dreković, Igor Rill, Mario Periša, Nemanja Jovanović, Stipe Surać, Zoran Marinović
- Press category: Putin in Belgrade by Vlado Kos
- City category: Limitless by Aida Redžepagić
- People category: Drvo Života by Denis Ruvić
- Nature category: Jesenjski vjetar by Dino Šimek
- Abstract/Creative category: Three Sisters by Giulio Zanni

=== 2015 ===
- Jury: Paul Lowe, Amel Emrić, Stoyan Nenov, Ivana Tomanović, Jože Suhadolnik, Jetmir Idrizi, Yannis Kontos, Osman Orsal, Iva Prosoli, Petrut Calinescu, Duško Miljanić
- Press category: Putin in Belgrade by Vlado Kos
- City category: Limitless by Aida Redžepagić
- People category: Drvo Života by Denis Ruvić
- Nature category: Jesenjski vjetar by Dino Šimek
- Abstract/Creative category: Three Sisters by Giulio Zanni

=== 2016 ===
- Jury: Myles Little, Ilvy Njiokiktjien, Srđan Živulović, Petar Jurica, Goran Lizdek, Daniel Mihailescu, Srđan Ilić, Boryana Katsarova, Majlinda Hoxha, Ljiljana Karadžić, Ana Farngovska, Ferhat Uludaglar – Zupcevic
- Grand Prix award: Selfie kultura by Jelena Janković
- Nudity category: Blue body by Đula Bezeg
- Fashion category: Fashion Fetish by Franjo Matković
- Mobile Phone category: Senke by Irfan Ličina
- Nature category: Church in the fields of Sorško polje by Andrej Tarfila
- Portrait category: Vlăduț by Ioana Cîrling
- Sports category: Traditional Wrestling by MD Tanveer Hassan Rohan
- News and Politics category: Idomeni, border closed by Olmo Calvo
- Report category: Veterans by Sasha Maslov
- Abstract/Creative category: Frentic City by HanShun Zhou

=== 2017 ===
- Jury: Bénédicte Kurzen, Jim Casper, Máximo Panés, Maral Deghati, Ana Frangovska, Damir Senčar, Marko Marinković, Imre Szabo, Burim Myftiu, Senad Šahmanović, Aleksandra Nina Knežević, Ahmed Burić, Miro Majcen
- Grand Prix award: Selfie kultura by Jelena Janković
- Nudity category: Blue body by Đula Bezeg
- Fashion category: Fashion Fetish by Franjo Matković
- Mobile Phone category: Senke by Irfan Ličina
- Nature category: Church in the fields of Sorško polje by Andrej Tarfila
- Portrait category: Vlăduț by Ioana Cîrling
- Sports category: Traditional Wrestling by MD Tanveer Hassan Rohan
- News and Politics category: Idomeni, border closed by Olmo Calvo
- Report category: Veterans by Sasha Maslov
- Abstract/Creative category: Frentic City by HanShun Zhou
