= Sarajevo Ramadan Festival =

Annual cultural festival in Sarajevo, Bosnia

- Genre: Religious and cultural festival
- Date: The month of Ramadan
- Frequency: annual
- Locations: Sarajevo, Bosnia and Herzegovina
- Years active: 2014 - 2019
- Founder: Sarajevo Navigator Foundation

The Sarajevo Ramadan Festival (Bosnian: Sarajevo Ramazan Festival; Cyrillic: Сарајево Рамазан Фестивал) was an annual religious and cultural festival held in Sarajevo, Bosnia and Herzegovina that celebrated the Islamic holy month of Ramadan. The festival was established in 2014 by the Sarajevo Navigator Foundation and the Zone of Improved Business (ZUP) Baščaršija in cooperation with the European Union's PHOENIX – Culture for the Future project, and ran until 2019. It was endorsed by the Oriental Institute in Sarajevo. The aim of the festival was the creation of inter-religious dialogue and the promotion of peace, reconciliation and solidarity among faith groups through the presentation of Islamic art and culture.

== Format ==
The festival lasted for the length of Ramadan and was composed of numerous programmes that were held all over the city. Open-air Iftar, the evening meal with which Muslims end their daily Ramadan fast at sunset, open to Muslims and non-Muslims alike, was organized every evening in the Žuta Tabija fortress that overlooks the city. Exhibitions of Islamic art, including calligraphy, paintings, pottery and marquetry were held in the Gazi Husrev-beg Library which also hosted readings of renowned Islamic poetry. A trade fair of book publishers on Islamic art was another of the numerous festival programmes. Interactive lectures, panel discussions and Q&A's on Islamic theology, culture and art are held in the Gazi Husrev-beg Library and the Gazi Husrev-beg Madrasa. Lecturers and speakers have included Grand mufti Husein Kavazović, Islamic art historian Sabiha Al Khemir, German orientalist Stefan Weber and others. Concerts of different Islamic musical styles such as Nasheed, Dhikr or traditional Bosnian Sevdalinka are held in the Sarajevo National Theatre. The opening and closing ceremonies of the festival are held in the Žuta Tabija fortress.
