= Sarajevo Chamber Music Festival =

Annual classical music event in Sarajevo, Bosnia

- Genre: Chamber music
- Dates: August
- Locations: Sarajevo, Bosnia and Herzegovina
- Years active: 2011 – 2017

The Sarajevo Chamber Music Festival was an international multi-day chamber music festival which took place in Sarajevo, Bosnia and Herzegovina. It was established in 2011 by the Sarajevo Music Academy in cooperation with the Sarajevo Chamber Music Institute (SCMI) and the Manhattan String Quartet. The festival would last for 6 days and would, on average, host 30 international ensembles, lecturers and composers per edition.
