= WARM Festival =

Annual international festival in Sarajevo, Bosnia

- Status: active
- Genre: Art festival
- Location: Sarajevo
- Country: Bosnia and Herzegovina
- Years active: 2014 - present
- Founder: WARM Foundation
- Website: www.warmfoundation.org

The WARM Festival, established by the WARM Foundation, is an international festival on contemporary conflicts held annually in Sarajevo, Bosnia and Herzegovina.

== History ==
The WARM Foundation was founded during the "Sarajevo 2012" reunion of war reporters, organized on April 6, 2012, for the 20th anniversary of the war in Bosnia.

The first WARM Festival opened in 2014 on the 100th anniversary of the start of the First World War.
