= Icarus Festival for Dialogue between Cultures =

Icarus Festival for Dialogue between Cultures (Greek: Festival Politismikon Dialogon Ikarias) is a nonprofit international music festival that began in the summer of 2006 in Ikaria. The festival is an annual event organized by the Agios Kirykos, Evdilos, and Raches towns of Ikaria, a Greek island in the northern Aegean that bears the name of the mythical flyer Icarus. The Icarus Festival is also a celebration of culture on Ikaria, with cultural books and albums publicized during the festival. The Icarus Festival hosts well-known artists who mostly perform original work. The name "Icarus Festival" is inspired by the myth of Icarus, who dared to fly anywhere even at the cost of his own life. The Icarus Festival is a cultural travel destination in Greece that is listed in several travel magazines.

== History ==
The festival's purpose is to host performances by artists or groups whose music is a product of multicultural participation or inspiration. The first festival took place in July 2006. The artistic directors were Vangelis Fampas and Klaudia Delmer.

The Icarus Festival held in 2008 was dedicated to the violin, a popular instrument on the island of Ikaria. This marked the expansion of the Festival to include art forms such as dance and dance lessons, theater, photography, painting, cinema, and classical mythology. The Icarus Film Festival, supported by the Greek Film Center, the Mediterranean Film Institute and the cinema club of Agios Kirikos, led the way in bringing film into the Icarus Festival.

In the summer of 2009, the International Music, Drama, and Film Festival was held in conjunction with the Icarus Festival. This festival featured Latin American culture and the Ancient Greek drama Socrates's Apology.

Notable groups and artists who have participated in the Festival's functions include:

- Etnika (Malta)
- Christina Kouki (Balkans)
- L' Ham de Foc (Spain)
- Motion Trio (Poland)
- Electra Papasimaki (European Baroque)
- Margarita Plessas (Argentina)
- Mimis Plessas - Klaudia Delmer (Greece - Poland)
- Lisa Hughes (United States)
- Encardia (Greece - Italy)
- Tangarto - Tanguero (Greece - Argentina)
- Fabian Ballejos (Argentina)
- Maria Bermudez - Chicana Gypsy (USA - Spain)
- Vassilis Lekkas - Giannis Spathas (Greece)
- George Psihogios (Greece)
- Theros - Lamia Bedhioui (Greece - Tunisia
- Christos Tsiamoulis - Halil Karaduman (Greece - Turkey)
- Fabien Ballejos - Gina Nikolitsa - Novitango Quintet (Argentina - Greece)
- DROM (Romani - Greece)
- Ship of Fools (Holland - Europe)
- Djamel Benyelles - Djam & Fam (Oran, Algeria - France)
- Marta Sebestyen - Kostis Avyssinos (Hungary - Crete)
- Voces Del Sur (Chile - Scotland)
- Sotiria Leonardou - Vangelis Fampas - Panos Fourtounas (Greece)
- Ypogeia Revmata (Greece)
- Makis Seviloglou - Kaiti Koullia (Greece - Balkans)
- En mia Nykti - Fide KÖksal - Cihan Turkoglu - Solis Barki (Turkey - Greece)
- Margarida Guerreiro (Portugal)
- Luna Piena Trio (Italy - Sicily)
- Quartaumentata (Calabria, Italy)
- Leonardo Gomez - Amor Latino - Janet Kapuya (Chile - Greece - Uruguay)
- Monika (Greece)
- Cabaret Balkan (Greece - Balkans)
