= Jelah =

Village in Tešanj, Bosnia and Herzegovina

- Location within Bosnia and Herzegovina
- Coordinates: 44°39′16″N 17°57′34″E
- Country: Bosnia and Herzegovina
- Entity: Federation of Bosnia and Herzegovina
- Canton: Zenica-Doboj
- Municipality: Tešanj

Area
  - Total: 1.32 sq mi (3.41 km^{2})

Population (2013)
  - Total: 2,911
  - Density: 2,210/sq mi (854/km^{2})
- Time zone: UTC+1 (CET)
  - Summer (DST): UTC+2 (CEST)

Jelah is a village in the municipality of Tešanj, Bosnia and Herzegovina.

Jelah is near the river Usora in the northern part of Bosnia and Herzegovina, located between Teslić and Doboj. It is administratively part of the Zenica-Doboj Canton of the Federation of Bosnia and Herzegovina.

== Demographics ==
According to the 2013 census, the population was 2,911. In the 1991 census, Jelah had approximately 1,600 residents, indicating a significant population increase in the 1990s and 2000s.

Ethnicity in 2013
Ethnicity	Number	Percentage
Bosniaks	2,392	82.2%
Croats	322	11.1%
Serbs	29	1.0%
other/undeclared	168	5.8%
Total	2,911	100%
