= Pop-Up! Sarajevo =

- Status: Active
- Genre: Art festival
- Frequency: Annual
- Location: Sarajevo
- Country: Bosnia and Herzegovina
- Years active: 2014 - present
- Founder: Academy of Fine Arts Sarajevo
- Attendance: 10,000
- Website: popupfest.net

Pop-Up! Sarajevo is an international student graphics design and visual communications festival held annually in Sarajevo, Bosnia and Herzegovina. The festival was established in 2014 by the Departement of graphics design of the Sarajevo Academy of Fine Arts. It lasts for seven days. Each year's edition programmes exhibitions, lectures, workshops and film screenings that are focused on the fields of digital illustration, new media, digital animation, video production, motion graphic design, concept art and caricatures.

== Gallery ==
2016 edition poster
