= Pafos Aphrodite Festival Cyprus =

The Pafos Aphrodite Festival Cyprus is a company established to promote Paphos in Cyprus as an international centre of high-profile cultural events. Its aim is to organise and manage a yearly international artistic event that takes place at the square in front of the medieval castle at the harbour in Kato Paphos. It organises and hosts an opera performance at the end of August or early September and has over the years invited a variety of companies and performances to the festival:

== Productions ==
year	opera	composer	company	country
1999	Aida	Giuseppe Verdi	Bolshoi Theatre of Moscow	Russia
2000	Carmen	Georges Bizet	Estonian National Opera	Estonia
2001	Nabucco	Giuseppe Verdi	Polish National Opera	Poland
2001	Zorba the Greek	Mikis Theodorakis	Polish National Opera	Poland
2002	Turandot	Giacomo Puccini	Polish National Opera	Poland
2003	Tosca	Giacomo Puccini	Arena di Verona	Italy
2004	Rigoletto	Giuseppe Verdi	Polish National Opera	Poland
2005	La Traviata	Giuseppe Verdi	Polish National Opera	Poland
2006	Un Ballo in Maschera	Giuseppe Verdi	Mariinsky Theatre St Petersburg	Russia
2007	Il Trovatore	Giuseppe Verdi	Abai State Academic Opera & Ballet Theatre	Kazakhstan
2008	Madama Butterfly	Giacomo Puccini	Lyric Theatre Trieste	Italy
2009	Lakmé	Léo Delibes	Sofia National Opera	Bulgaria
2010	La Bohème	Giacomo Puccini	Slovak National Theatre	Slovakia
2011	Les contes d'Hoffmann	Jacques Offenbach	Opera of the National Theatre Prague	Czech Republic
2012	Otello	Giuseppe Verdi	Slovak National Theatre	Slovakia
2013	L'Elisir d'Amore	Gaetano Donizetti	Opera Futura Verona	Italy
2014	Così Fan Tutte	Wolfgang Amadeus Mozart	Opera Futura Verona	Italy
2015	La Cenerentola	Gioachino Rossini	Ramfis Productions Avignon	France
2016	Don Giovanni	Wolfgang Amadeus Mozart	Teatro Regio (Parma)	Italy
2017	Die Entführung aus dem Serail	Wolfgang Amadeus Mozart	Teatro Regio (Parma)	Italy
2018	Il Barbiere di Siviglia	Gioachino Rossini	C.I.A.L.M. - Teatro Lirico Italiano	Italy
2019	Macbeth	Giuseppe Verdi	The Bolshoi Theatre of Belarus	Belarus
2024	La Traviata	Giuseppe Verdi	Georgian National Opera	Georgia
2025	Carmen	Georges Bizet	State Opera and Ballet Theatre of Tbilisi	Georgia
