= Sarajevo Street Art Festival =

Sarajevo Street Art Festival Festival ulične umjetnosti Sarajevo
- Status: active
- Genre: Art festival
- Location: Sarajevo
- Country: Bosnia and Herzegovina
- Years active: 2015 - 2020
- Website: www.fuu.ba

The Sarajevo Street Art Festival (Bosnian: Festival ulične umjetnosti Sarajevo / Фестивал уличне умјетности Сарајево) was a street art festival that was held in Sarajevo, Bosnia and Herzegovina between 2015 and 2020. It was held in July of every year and would last for three days. Each year's edition comprised numerous street performances, the creation of a new street art quarter in the city, concerts, the painting of large murals and the showcasing of other creative art forms. The final day of the festival was dedicated to children and entailed stage music, theatrical and gymnastics workshops, jugglers and street magicians.
