= Anibar International Animation Festival =

Animated film festival in Kosova

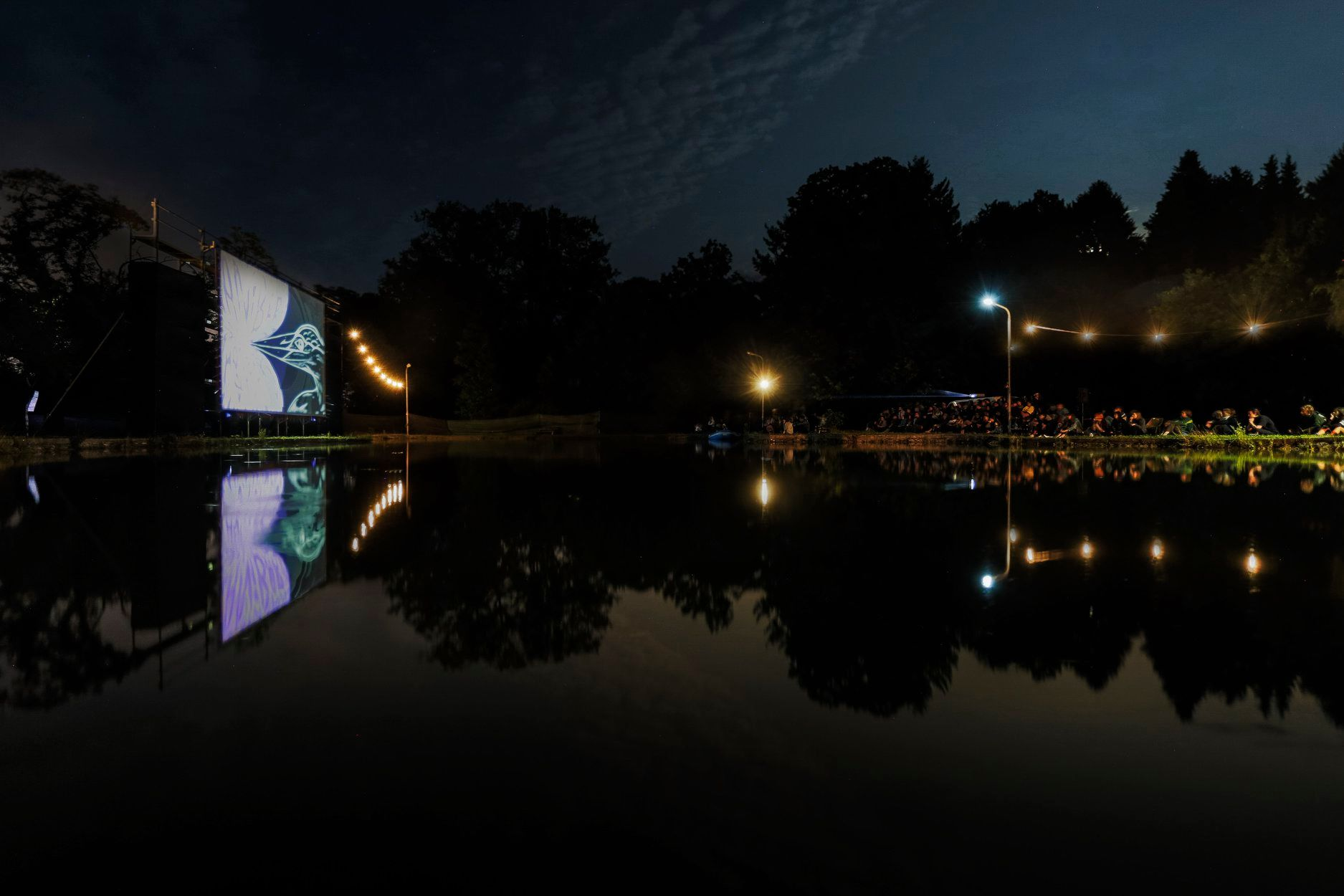
Film Screening at Anibar

Anibar International Animation Festival is an annual festival dedicated to animated movies, held every year in Peja, Kosovo.

Every summer, the festival transforms the city of Peja into a hub for animation and cultural exchange through film screenings, workshops, discussions, and concerts.

Alongside the festival week, Anibar pursues its broader mission of capacity-building by organizing training seminars, debates, and other activities that provide visibility and support for emerging artists.

== History ==
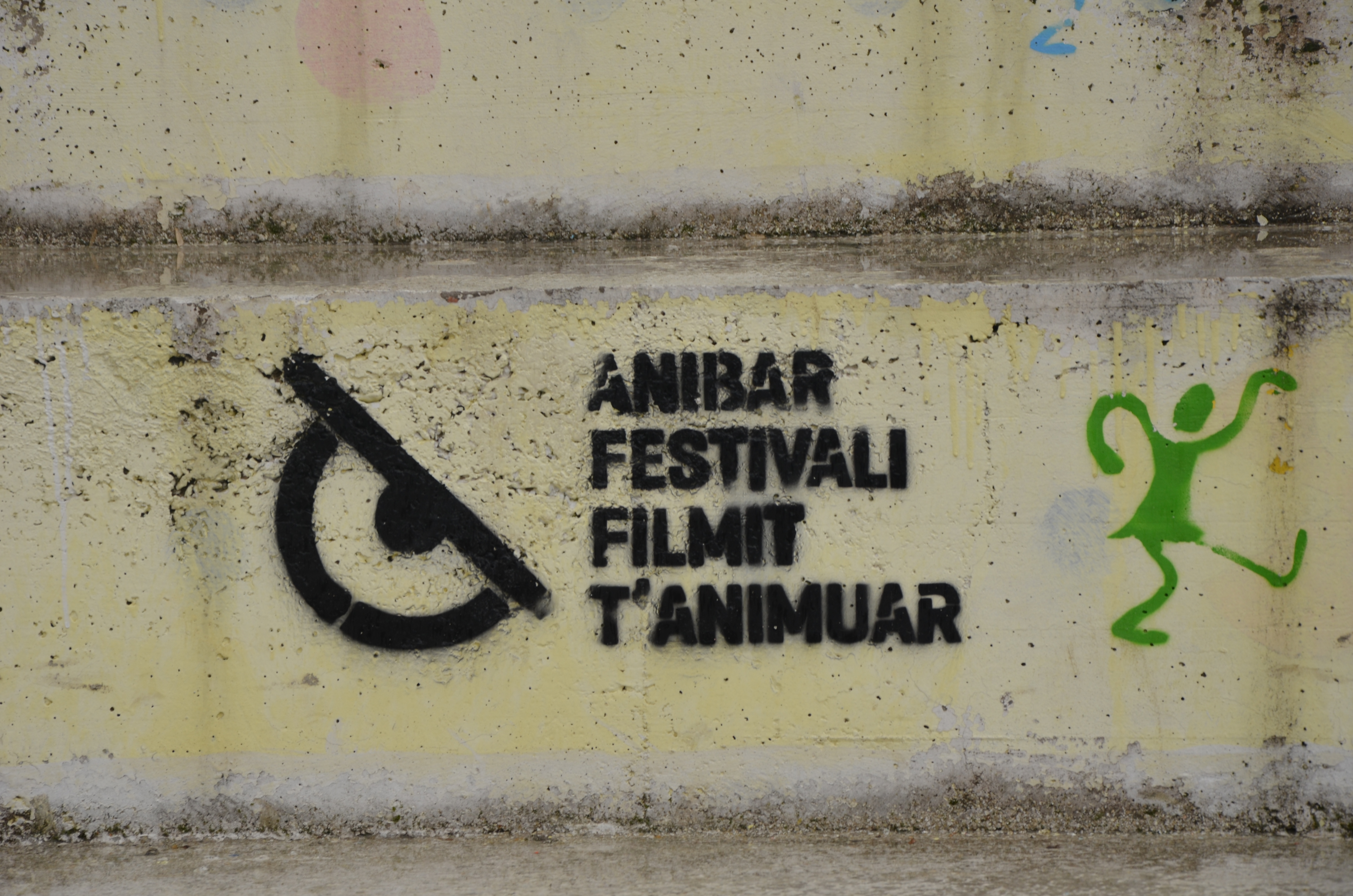
Anibar

Anibar organization was founded in 2010 by a group of young art activists. What began with a budget of €500 and 80 films has since grown into one of the largest cultural events in Kosova, attracting around 15,000 visitors annually and participants from more than 50 countries.

The festival has played a significant role in revitalizing cultural life in Peja. In 2014, Anibar organization began discussions with the Municipality of Peja regarding the revitalization of the city’s only functional cinema "Jusuf Gërvalla. Although Anibar had been using the space for festival screenings since 2010, the cinema itself had largely remained non-functional for many years.

In 2016, the municipal assembly granted Anibar a 15-year mandate to administer the cinema. Under this agreement, Anibar presented a broad program that extended far beyond the festival week, including the development of the Animation Academy.

The revitalization transformed "Jusuf Gërvalla" cinema into a cultural center, with activities happening throughout the year, strengthening Peja’s cultural life.

Today, Anibar is known not only as an animation festival but also as a tool for cultural revival, education, dialogue, exchange, and art. The festival has had the power to transform Peja into a center of animation and continues to stand as a symbol of creativity, resilience, and freedom of expression.

== Program ==
Films are divided into competitive and non-competitive categories.

The competitive program includes the following categories:

- International
- Balkan
- Student
- Human Rights
- Animated Music Video
- Young Audience

Meanwhile, non-competitive categories are:

- Virtual Reality
- Experimental Animation
- Animated Documentary
- Commissioned Works

== Venues ==
Cinema-City "Jusuf Gërvalla" has a capacity of 300 seats, and features special programs, including those for children.

Competitive films are screened daily during the festival at the following spaces:

- Cinema "Cubes"
- Istref Begolli theatre
- Cinema “lake” is an outdoor cinema by the lake, with 100 seats and inflatable boats.

Beyond film screenings, the festival hosts presentations, masterclasses, industry sessions such as Producers Meet Creators and Meet the Filmmakers, as well as panels, debates, and concerts. Open-air screenings and youth programs are part of its community outreach, alongside the Animation Academy training program.

== Awards ==
Anibar gives awards in different categories, such as:

- International Competition
- Student Competition
- Balkan Competition
- “Pitch It!”
- Human Rights
- Animated Music Video
- Young Audience

== Editions ==
=== 2011 ===
The second edition of the Anibar International Animation Festival held in 2011 continued to establish the festival as a platform for young artists and filmmakers in Kosova and the region.

Category	Winner	Country	Director(s)
International Competition	The External World	Ireland	David O’Rally
International Competition (Special Mention)	Tussilago	Sweden	Jonas Odell
Balkan Competition	Guernika	Albania	Shaqir Veseli
Balkan Competition (Special Mention)	Dove Sei, Amor Mio	Croatia	Veljko Popović

=== 2012 ===
Category	Winner	Country	Director(s)
International Competition	The Backwater Gospel	Denmark	Bo Mathorne
International Competition (Special Mention)	Oh Willy	Belgium	Emma de Swaet, Marc Roels
International Competition (Special Mention)	Borby Deline	Switzerland	Dustin Rees
International Competition (Special Mention)	In the Beginning of Time	Croatia	Bozidar Trkulja
Student Competition	The Father	—	Bogdanovit
Student Competition (Special Mention)	Perfect Life	Turkey	Ozgul Gurbuz
Student Competition (Special Mention)	Michael Pollan’s Food Rules	—	Marija Jacimovic, Benoît Detalle
Student Competition (Special Mention)	The Promise of Constantine	—	Marvina Cela

=== 2013 ===
The 4th edition of the Anibar International Animation Festival was held under the theme No Humans Allowed. The theme reflected on the relationship between humans, nature, and technology, encouraging audiences to imagine worlds beyond human-centered perspectives.

Category	Winner	Country	Director(s)
International Competition	Darling / Liebling	Poland	Izabela Plucinska
Student Competition	The Rabbit and the Deer	Hungary	Péter Vácz
Balkan Competition	Ifran University	—	Riduam

=== 2014 ===
Category	Winner	Country	Director(s)
International Competition	Baths	Hungary	Tomek Ducki
International Competition (Special Mention)	Papa	Germany	Kun Jia
International Competition (Special Mention)	Marilyn Myller	United Kingdom	Mikey Please
Student Competition	The Bigger Picture	United States	Daisy Jacobs
Student Competition (Special Mention)	Holding Brother’s Hand and How the Jelly Explodes	Germany	Kiana Naghshineh
Student Competition (Special Mention)	But Milk is Important	Sweden	Anna Mantzaris, Eirik Grønmo Bjørnsen
Balkan Competition	Rabbitland	Serbia	Ana Nedeljkovic, Nikola Majdak
Balkan Competition (Special Mention)	Hunger	Croatia	Petra Zlonoga
Balkan Competition (Special Mention)	Simulacra	Croatia	Ivana Bošnjak, Thomas Johnson
Audience Award	Don’t Fear Death	Canada	Louis Hudson

=== 2015 ===
The 6th edition of the Anibar International Animation Festival theme was Migration. The program included 200 animated films. This edition emphasized tolerance and the role of animated films in encouraging young people to understand social issues through creativity. A special highlight was the participation of Mike Reiss, a producer of The Simpsons, who shared insights into the making of the iconic series, including stories about guest stars and production challenges. The festival also welcomed back Italian collaborators from the Ottoman Laboratori to run workshops teaching children how to create short-length animated films.

Category	Winner	Country	Director(s)
International Competition	We Can’t Live Without Cosmos	Russia	Konstantin Bronzit

=== 2016 ===
The 7th edition took place from 15 to 21 August and was focused on the environment climate change.

Category	Winner	Country	Director(s)
International Competition	A Coat Made Dark	Ireland	Jack O’Shea
International Competition (Student Special Mention)	Shell All	France	Zaver Najjar
Student Competition	Sea Child	United Kingdom	Minha Kim
Student Competition (Special Mention)	Velodrool	Estonia	Sander Joon
Student Competition (Special Mention)	The More I Know	Czech Republic	Marek Naprstek
Student Competition (Special Mention)	RRRING RRRING	Germany	Thomas Kneffel
Student Competition (Special Mention)	D 729	Belgium	Levi Stoops
Student Competition (Special Mention)	Ivan’s Need	Switzerland	Veronika L. Montano, Manuela Leuenberger, Lukas Suter
Balkan Competition	Of Slaves and Robots	Serbia	Miloc Tomic
Animated Music Video Competition	Quack Fat – Opiuo	Australia	Jonathan Chong
Environmental Competition	October 2050	Czech Republic	Alzbeta Gobelova
Audience Award	He Who Has Two Souls	France	Fabrice Luang-Vija

=== 2017 ===
Reclaim the City, was the official theme of this edition. Reclaim the City focused on the struggle for democratic values in public space. The festival attracted many people, with different activities that represented a depoliticized culture as well as a more open mindset toward new media.

Category	Winner	Country	Director(s)
International Competition	Nothing Happens	Denmark	Michelle Kranot, Uri Kranot
International Competition (Special Mention)	Pussy	Poland	Renata Gąsiorowska
International Competition (Special Mention)	Ogre	France	Laurene Braibant
International Competition (Special Mention)	Nighthawk	Slovenia	Spela Cadez
Student Competition	Oh, Mother	Poland	Paulina Ziolkowska
Student Competition (Special Mention)	Juliette	Belgium	Lora D’Addazio
Student Competition (Special Mention)	Tough	Canada	Jennifer Zheng
Student Competition (Special Mention)	It’s a Date	United States	Zachary Zezima
Music Video Competition	Zapaska	Ukraine	Oleg Shcherba
Music Video Competition (Special Mention)	GastaLoops	United Kingdom	Nicola Gastaldi
Balkan Competition	Wicked Girl	France	Ayce Kartal
Balkan Competition (Special Mention)	20 Kicks	Bulgaria	Dimitar Dimitrov

=== 2018 ===
The 9th edition of the Anibar Festival was organized under the theme 50:50 - Gender Equality and Women Empowerment.

During this edition, several panels were held, aiming to promote awareness whereas 220 animated films were screened. The idea was to inspire both women and men to address gender inequalities.

Category	Winner	Country	Director(s)
International Competition	Carlotta’s Face	Germany	Frédéric Schuld
International Competition (Special Mention)	Intimity	Spain	Amarna Miller
Student Competition	Flower Found!	Netherlands	Jorn Leeuwerink
Student Competition (Special Mention)	Auegenblick – A Blink of an Eye	Germany	Kiana Naghshineh
Student Competition (Special Mention)	Enough	Sweden	Anna Mantzaris
Balkan Competition	Untravel	Serbia	Nikola Majdak Jr., Ana Nedeljkovic
Balkan Competition (Special Mention)	The Monk	Thailand	Juck Somsaman
Animated Music Video Competition	Happy	—	—
Animated Music Video Competition (Special Mention)	FINKEL: w/o	France	Sanni Lahtinen
Animated Music Video Competition (Special Mention)	Engine of Progress	—	—
Feature Film Competition	Chris the Swiss	Switzerland	Anja Kofmel
Public Award	iRony	United Kingdom	Amy Nicholson

=== 2019 ===
This edition of the Anibar International Animation Festival took place under the theme “Hopes and Fears”, highlighting the collective hopes and fears of our society. Through animation, the festival sought to spark dialogue on political, social, and environmental challenges, while giving young people and artists the space to express their visions and encourage civic activism. This edition marked a decade of Anibar as a vital cultural and artistic platform in Kosovo, showcasing the power of art to inspire social change and preserve hope for a better future.

Category	Winner	Country	Director(s)
International Competition	And Then the Bear	France	Agnes Patron
International Competition (Special Mention)	I’m Going Out for Cigarettes	France	Osman Cerfon
International Competition (Special Mention)	Egg	United States	Martina Scarpelli
Student Competition	Applesauce	Austria	Alexander Gratzer
Student Competition (Special Mention)	Hide N Seek	Czech Republic	Barbora Halířová
Balkan Competition	Imbued Life	Croatia	Thomas Johnson, Ivana Bosnjak
Balkan Competition (Special Mention)	N’korniz	Kosova	Gëzim Ramizi
Feature Film Competition	The Tower	Norway	Mats Grorud
Animated Music Video Competition	SIAMÉS – MR. FEAR	Argentina	Pablo Rafael Roldán, Ezequiel Torres
Audience Award	Toomas Beneath the Valley of the Wild Wolves	Croatia	Chintis Lundgren

=== 2020 ===
During the COVID-19 pandemic, Anibar was organised in the virtual format for the first time. This year's theme was "Humans", and through films, presentations, and panels throughout the weeks of the festival, the main focus was on the collective humanitarian effort, which was highlighted even more because of the situation caused by COVID-19.

=== 2021 ===
After COVID, the festival's theme was "Isolation". It reflected challenges of the COVID-19 pandemic and resulting solitude and claustrophobia. It included hybrid, online, and in-person events during July 23–30.

Category	Winner	Country	Director(s)
International Competition	Souvenir Souvenir	France	Bastien Dubois
International Competition (Special Mention)	My Galactic Twin Galaction	Russia	Sasha Svirsky
Student Competition	Butterfly Jam	France	Shih-Yen Huang
Student Competition (Special Mention)	Coffin	France (co-production)	Yuanqing Cai, Nathan Crabot, Houzhi Huang, Mikolaj Janiw, Mandimby Lebon, Théo Tran Ngoc
Balkan Competition	Those Who Drown Cling to Foam	Kosovo	Urtina Hoxha
Balkan Competition (Special Mention)	Elusiveness	Serbia	Marija Vulić
Animated Music Video Competition	A Little Too Much	United States	Martina Scarpelli
Animated Music Video Competition (Special Mention)	Kona	Kosova	Shpat Morina
Feature Film Competition	Kill It and Leave This Town	Poland	Mariusz Wilczyński
Human Rights Competition	Where Were You?	Spain	María Trénor Colomer
Human Rights Competition (Special Mention)	We Have One Heart	Poland	Katarzyna Warzecha

=== 2022 ===
The theme of this year's festival was Superstitions.

=== 2023 ===
The 14th edition of Anibar International Animation Festival took place from 17 to 23 July 2023 under the theme “Love - Dashni”.

Amid a world of division and chaos, the festival reminded everyone that love has no boundaries, is abundant, and exists in many dimensions. It highlighted love as a transformative social and cultural force, emphasizing human connections and inclusivity.

The program explored the multifaceted nature of love, addressing its complexities and diverse manifestations through animated films, discussions, and other cultural activities.

Category	Winner	Country	Director(s)
International Competition	Eeva	Estonia/Croatia	Lucija Mezljak, Morten Tsinakov
Feature Film Competition	Silver Bird and Rainbow Fish	US	Lei Lei
Student Competition	Above the Clouds	Hungary	Vivien Harshegyi
Balkan Competition	Money and Happiness	Serbia	Ana Nedeljkovic, Nikola Majdak Jr.
Human Rights Competition	Dear Mahsa	Austria	Martin Pflanzer
Animated Music Video Competition	Ninulla F	Kosova	Flaka Kokolli
Young Audience Competition	Beanboy	Denmark	Emily Hanning

=== 2024 ===
The 15th edition of Anibar was held in 2024 under the theme “Smash the Patriarchy”, focusing on systemic inequality and gender discrimination. The program included film screenings, panel discussions, educational activities, and music events, with an emphasis on equity, inclusion, diversity, and a healed society.

Category	Winner	Director(s)
International Competition	Zima	Tomek Popakul, Kasumi Ozeki
Balkan Competition	The Family Portrait	Lea Vidakovic
Student Competition	Bunnyhood	Mansi Maheshwari
Student Competition (Special Mention)	Adiós	José Prats
Human Rights Competition	Chicken	Anna Benner
Human Rights Competition (Special Mention)	Kissing Day	Director
Animated Music Video Competition	Illusion	Jin Woo
Animated Music Video Competition (Special Mention)	Stop the Music	Weronika Anna Marianna
Young Audience Competition	Out There	Evgeniy Golovin, Alexander Afonasyev
Young Audience Competition (Special Mention)	Hoofs on Skates	Ignas Meilūnas
Pitch Competition – 1st Place	Stick With Me	Albana Hajdini
Pitch Competition – 2nd Place	Imagine if You Can’t Imagine the Imaginable	Kaltrina Berisha
Pitch Competition – 3rd Place	Inside a Box	Bleona Ibrahimi
Audience Award	Our Uniform	Yegane Moghaddam

== Socio-Economic Impact ==
Since its establishment, Anibar has grown beyond being just an organization. It has become an important driver of socio-economic development in Peja and Kosova at large.

Every year, the festival attracts thousands of visitors from Kosova, the region, and abroad. This influx of people contributes directly to the local economy through increased demand for accommodation, food services, transportation, and other local businesses.

Moreover, the festival strengthens Kosova’s international image as both a cultural and economic destination. By positioning Peja on the map of global animation festivals, Anibar showcases the city’s creativity, resilience, and openness to cultural exchange.

Most recent study conducted by Idra Research and Consulting Firm confirmed that visitor spending during the festival, covering accommodation, food, and other services has a positive impact on the local economy.

According to the data, accommodation expenses at Anibar are one of the essential categories where participants spend an average of €66.10, leading to an estimated total expenditure of €480,877.50 during the 16th edition of the festival, held in 2024.

Meanwhile, in total, expenditures across all categories amount to €1,671,067.50.
