= List of festivals in Sarajevo =

This is a list of festivals in Sarajevo, Bosnia and Herzegovina.

== Arts and crafts ==
- Balkan Photo Festival, January
- Beton Fest, July
- FEDU, May
- PitchWise Festival, September
- Pop Art Festival, May
- Pop-Up! Sarajevo, December
- Sarajevo Poetry Days, September
- Sarajevo Street Art Festival, July
- SOS Design Festival, October
- Spiritus Progenitum, November
- WARM Festival, June

== Culture, heritage and folk ==
- American Folk Blues Festival
- Baščaršija Nights, July
- Five Days of Zagreb in Sarajevo, June
- Ilidža Folk Music Festival, July
- Ilidža International Children's Folklore Festival, June
- Sarajevo Irish Festival, March
- Sarajevo Winter Festival, December

== Film ==
- Al Jazeera Balkans Documentary Film Festival, September
- Merlinka Film Festival, January
- Pravo Ljudski Film Festival, November
- Sarajevo Fashion Film Festival, December
- Sarajevo Film Festival, August
- Sarajevo Youth Film Festival, September
- VIVA Film Festival, May

== Food ==
- BeeFest
- Coffee Fest Sarajevo, February
- Sarajevo StreeAt Food Festival, July

== Literature ==
- Bookstan, June

== Politics and activism ==
- OPEN Fest Sarajevo, January
- Open University of Sarajevo, November

== Religion ==
- Kao nekad pred Božić, December
- Sarajevo Ramadan Festival, Ramadan

== Theatre and Performing arts ==
- Ballet Fest Sarajevo, September
- InterDance Fest, May
- Juventafest, September
- Lutfest (East Sarajevo), May
- MESS International Theatre Festival, October
- Smile of Sarajevo Theatre Festival, May
- Teatarfest, April

== LGBTQ ==
- Merlinka Festival, January
- Sarajevo Pride, August–September

== Music ==
- Dva Super Dana, April
- Festival 84, March
- Jazz Fest Sarajevo, November
- Garden of Dreams, June
- Sarajevo Beer Festival, July
- Sarajevo Chamber Music Festival, August
- Sarajevo Evenings of Music, May
- Sarajevo International Guitar Festival, April
- Sonemus Fest, April–May
- Orfej (Sarajevo - East Sarajevo), April
