= Emina =

Emina is a feminine given name. Notable people with the name include:

- Emina Bektas (born 1993), American tennis player
- Emina Cunmulaj (born 1984), Albanian-American model
- Emina Ekic (born 1999), Bosnian-American professional women's footballer
- Emina Haračič (born 1995), Slovenian rhythmic gymnast
- Emina Ilhamy (1858–1931), Egyptian princess
- Emina Jahović (born 1982), Serbian-Turkish singer of Bosniak ethnicity
- Emina Kamberović (born 1945), Bosnian former ballerina and ballet professor
- Emina Malagich (born 1995), Russian short track speed skater
- Emina Sefić, Bosnian woman who inspired the sevdalinka
- Emina Soljanin, scientist and academic
- Emina Torlak, American computer scientist and software engineer
- Emina Yamaguchi (born 1994), Japanese women's professional shogi player
- Emina Zečaj (1929–2020), Bosnian sevdalinka singer
- Mirjana Emina Majić (born 1932), Croatian writer, poet and translator

== Other uses ==
- "Emina" (poem), Bosnian poem and sevdalinka
- Emina Mostar, women's professional football club in Bosnia and Herzegovina
- Paraguraleus emina, species of sea snail
