= Edina Papo =

Choreographer and Artistic Director of the Sarajevo Ballet

- Born: 9 April 1958 (age 67); Sarajevo, SR Bosnia and Herzegovina, Yugoslavia
- Education: Vaganova Academy of Russian Ballet, Rimsky-Korsakov Saint Petersburg Conservatory
- Alma mater: Saint Petersburg Conservatory
- Occupation(s): choreographer, educator

Edina Papo (née Hadžirović) born on 9 April 1958 in Sarajevo. She was the artistic director of the Sarajevo Ballet. As a choreographer and pedagogue, she has made great contributions to the redevelopment and renewal of ballet art in post-Bosnian War Sarajevo, that is, since 1996. She completed her ballet education at Vaganova Academy of Russian Ballet and N. A. Rimsky-Korsakov Saint Petersburg Conservatory in St. Petersburg. She enriched the repertoire with performances closer to the contemporary trends of modern ballet dance and current European theatre.

== Early life and education ==
She was born in Sarajevo, where she received a ballet education in parallel with high school. At the age of 16, she was engaged in the Sarajevo National Theater Ballet troop where, as the youngest member of the ensemble, she began performing solo roles. Since 1975, she worked as a ballet dancer and occasionally a ballet teacher and accompanist of rehearsals at the Sarajevo National Theater. She, then, went to study in Russia. In 1987, she graduated in ballet pedagogy and classical ballet methodology at the Vaganova Academy of Russian Ballet in St. Petersburg in the class of Professor Valentina Vasiljevna Rumjanceva, as the best student of the generation.

== Biography ==
Since 1987, she worked as a ballet teacher at the Elementary Music School 29 Novembar and the Secondary Music School in Sarajevo, where she taught the subjects: Classical Ballet, Historical Dances, Stage Character Dances and Historical Heritage. ↵In 1992, she specialized in choreography at the Rimsky Korsakov State Conservatory in St. Petersburg, Russia.

During the same period, she performed the duties of Head of the Ballet, Ballet Master, ballet pedagogue and choreographer at the Brașov Opera and Ballet Theater in Romania.1994. In 1994, she worked in two companies in Israel as a choreographer of Operete Israelit in Jerusalem, and as a guest-pedagogue in the Kibbutz Ga'aton ballet company in Tel-Aviv.

In 1996, she became a pedagogue, and in 1999 she became the Head of the Sarajevo National Theater Ballet. From 2003 to 2015, she served as the director of the Sarajevo National Theater Ballet, when the Ballet was transformed into an independent Organizational Unit within the Sarajevo National Theater.

On the occasion of the World Dance Day jubilee, she stated:

Dance is a much broader concept than what we think. Therefore, the dance is folklore, the dance is also official dances, the dance is contemporary ballet, classical ballet, dance for the alternative ballet scene. The first steps in thinking about art, as well as movement, were all what we call dance today. April 29 is a date that is significant because of the great Jean Georges Noverre, the reformer of ballet art who was the forerunner of the ballet performance that we today call classical ballet, as well as what we perceive in our minds, today's ballet that dates back almost 70 years in BiH as a professional art, as academic art, as something that is part of our everyday life and what is called the National Theater of Sarajevo.

At the 2022 Ballet Fest Sarajevo, Papo authored and organized an exhibition dedicated to Emina Kamberović's life and career. It was, hosted by Novi Hram Gallery in Sarajevo on 22 September, under the title "Veliki format".

== Achievements ==
- From 1989, when she started choreographing, until today, she has performed more than 30 independent and full-length ballet premieres. Choreographies were staged and performed with artists from Bosnia and Herzegovina as well as other republics from the former Yugoslavia and many other European countries.
- She has numerous engagements as a choreographer in operas, dramas, musicals with well-known and leading domestic and foreign directors.
- With the Ballet of the National Theater Sarajevo, she performed in Paris, Prague, Zagreb, Split, Podgorica, Belgrade, Brasov, Ohrid, and many other cities in Bosnia and Herzegovina and abroad, with the performances Dubrovački kantuni, Jabuka, Pulcinella, Katarina, the Bosnian queen, and so on.
- Under her leadership and work as a Ballet pedagogue and ballet master since 1997, many of Ballet soloists, who still play the ballet repertoire in Sarajevo today, were educated.
- The jubilee of 50 years of Ballet was marked with the ballet Pulcinella, choreographed by Papo, performed by local and visiting primas from all over the world.
- In the 2002/2003 season, she set up the so-called "white ballet" Giselle (as per Coralli, Perotto, Petipa) for the first time after the war in Bosnia and Herzegovina.
- In 2003, she set the premiere of the ballet Katarina, the Bosnian Queen.
- She twice choreographed the opening ceremony of the Sarajevo Winter International Festival, and was also a dance selector at the same festival.
- She is a frequent guest-choreographer of the Baščaršija Nights Festival.
- She is a regular guest at Monaco Dance Forum u Monte Karlu.
- As a teacher, she was a guest at the Prix de Lausanne, an international ballet competition.
- Her publications were printed in St. Petersburg, Russia.
- Godine 2010. na Međunarodnoj naučno-praktičnoj konferenciji objavljen je njen rad: Uticaj ruske baletske tradicije na balet u Bosni i Hercegovini (St.Peterburg).
- Her Russian artists and ballet art in Bosnia and Herzegovina was published in the Collection of Scientific Works of the Vaganova Academy of Russian Ballet,
- She published articles about ballet in the daily newspaper Oslobođenje.
- She was a reviewer for the monograph 50 Years of Ballet – Sarajevo Ballet Scene 1950–2000, authored by Halid Kuburović.
- Wrote the Foreword for the book The Art of Oriental Dance by Enisa Imamović.
- Wrote for the Međunarodni plesni magazin published in English and Spanish in England.
- Wrote for the Orchestra – magazine for artistic play, Serbia.
- She is the artistic director of Ballet Fest Sarajevo.

== Awards ==
- The first prize for choreography – the prize for the originality and artistic value of the ballet performance Fantastic Symphony to the music of Hector Berlioz, at the International choreography festival Iaş, Romania, in 1993.
- She is the recipient of an honorary award for her contribution to the development of ballet art in Romania, Opera Brasov, Romania.
- In 1999, she was awarded a Silver Brooch for art from the magazine for women and family, Žena 21.
- The most successful woman in the field of art and culture of Bosnia and Herzegovina for 2002 according to the magazine Žena 21.
- She is the winner of the award One of the 1000 successful women of the world for the year 2005, awarded by the American Biographical Institute Board of International Research.
- She is the recipient of the Isa beg Ishaković Award in 2010, Laureate for art.

== Public and political engagements ==
- She is the president of the Committee for Culture of the Jewish Municipality of Sarajevo and K.P.H.D. La Benevolencia.
- She was a representative in the Sarajevo Canton Assembly for two terms.
- She was politically involved in the Parliament of the Federation of Bosnia and Herzegovina.
