= Soljanin =

Šoljanin or Soljanin is a surname. Notable people with the surname include:

- Emina Soljanin, American engineer
- Mirza Šoljanin (born 1985), Bosnian singer
