= International Center for Children and Youth =

- Međunarodni centar za djecu i omladinu
- International Center for Children and Youth

- Location within Bosnia and Herzegovina
- Address: Kemala Kapetanovića 17, Sarajevo 71000
- Location: Bosnia and Herzegovina
- Coordinates: 43°51′01″N 18°23′26″E

Construction
- Opened: 1961
- Renovated: 1997; 2023
- Expanded: 2001; 2023

Website
- www.mladi.ba

The International Center for Children and Youth (Bosnian: Međunarodni centar za djecu i omladinu / Међународни центар за дјецу и омладину) is a cultural and arts center located in the Novo Sarajevo municipality, Sarajevo, Bosnia and Herzegovina. It was constructed in 1961 and was originally named the Vaso Pelagić Cultural Center after Vasa Pelagić, the 19th century Bosnian Serb writer, physician, educator, clergyman, nationalist and a proponent of utopian socialism. The center was heavily devastated during the Bosnian war and was subsequently renovated in 1997. In 2001 the center was expanded, rebranded and reestablished as the International Center for Children and Youth.

== History ==
After the Second World War the Yugoslav communist authorities started a massive infrastructural programme with the goal of promoting arts and culture. One of the programme's major focal points was the establishment of grass root cultural centers in every municipality which would host film screenings, cultural and folklore groups, literary nights, small theatre productions and so on.

In 1961, the authorities established such a center in the Grbavica neighbourhood of the Novo Sarajevo municipality. At the time, it was the largest municipality-run cultural center in Sarajevo and was named after Vasa Pelagić. With the start of the Bosnian war and the Siege of Sarajevo in 1992, the center found itself in Serb controlled territory and was severely devastated. In 1997 it was renovated and further expanded in 2001 when it was reestablished under a new name - the International Center for Children and Youth.

Today, the center hosts daily workshops, exhibitions, theatre productions and sport activities. Furthermore, it is a venue for a handful of annual festivals that are held in the city, including Juventafest, FEDU and Beton Fest. It has hosted numerous concerts.

== Facilities ==
The International Center for Children and Youth offers a diverse array of facilities designed to support cultural, educational, and recreational activities for children and young people. The center includes multipurpose halls and a large performing arts stage suitable for hosting workshops, exhibitions, theater performances, concerts, and festivals. These spaces are equipped to accommodate various events.

In addition to event spaces, the center houses several specialized rooms and studios dedicated to different disciplines. These include areas for web design courses, judo and karate training, drawing and painting classes, drama workshops, ballet, music lessons, and chess clubs. Such facilities provide opportunities for children and youth to engage in creative and physical activities, enhancing their skills and interests.

The center also features outdoor areas that are utilized for various programs and activities, contributing to a holistic environment for learning and development.
