= Bijela Tabija =

Fortress in Sarajevo

White Fortress
- Bijela Tabija / Бијела Табија
- Part of Walled City of Vratnik
- Sarajevo, Bosnia and Herzegovina
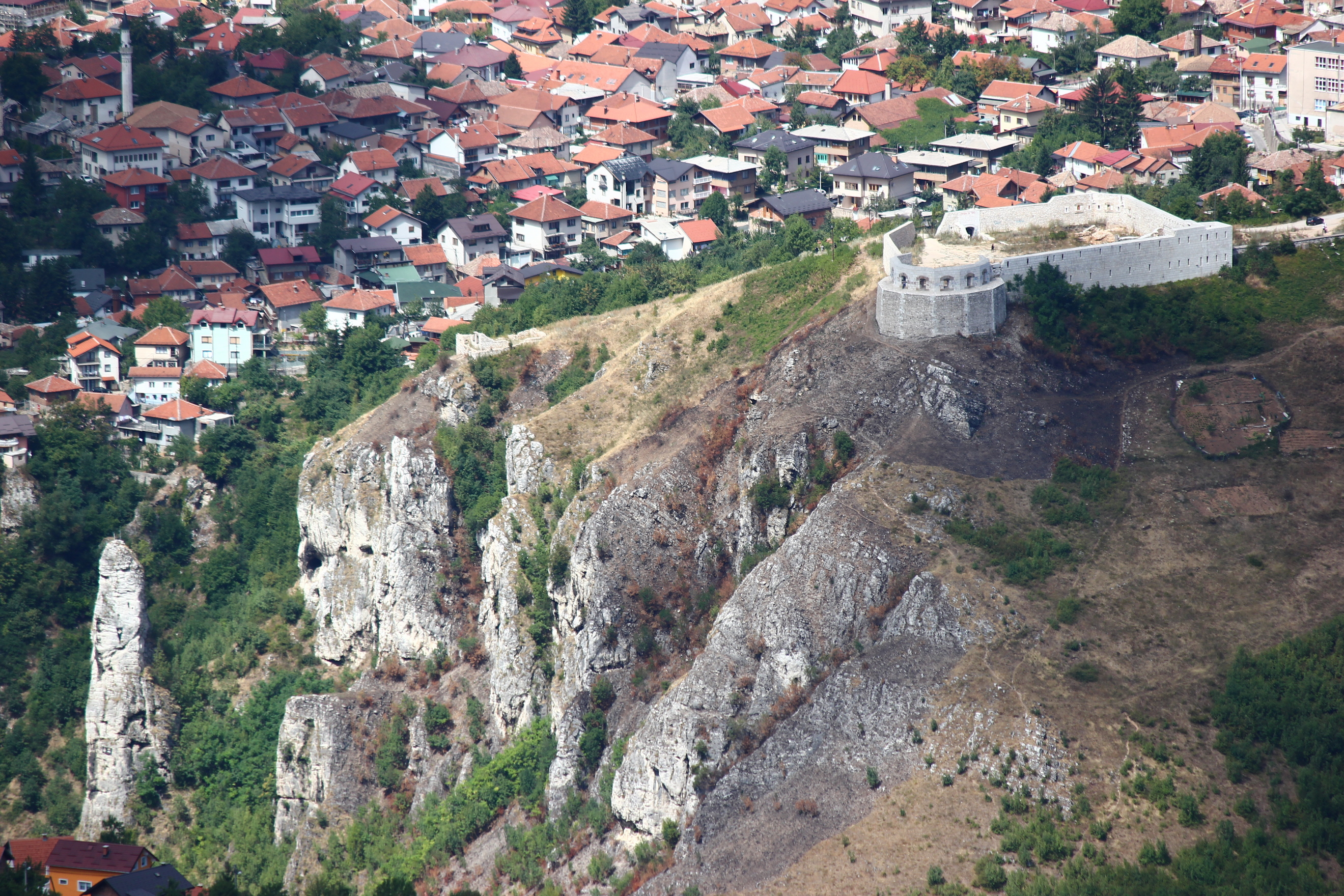
- Bijela Tabija as seen from Trebević mountain

Site information
- Type: Fortress

Location
- Coordinates: 43.8594°N 18.4445°E

Site history
- Built: c. 1550; 1727-1739
- Built by: Ahmed-paša Rustempšić Skopljak
- Materials: limestone

The White Fortress (Bosnian/Croatian/Serbian: Bijela Tabija, Бијела Табија) is an old fort overlooking the historic core of Sarajevo. It is a national monument of Bosnia and Herzegovina. Bijela Tabija is 667 metres (2,188 ft) above sea level. Bijela Tabija is a protruding part of the wall of what was historically known as the old Vratnik City, and dominates the Eastern, the natural entrance to Sarajevo. It is built of stone and it used to house a gun-crew and an ammunition storage. Its thick walls have openings for cannons.

== History ==
As far as the precise year of construction goes, differing opinions have been put forward. One of them proposes that Bijela Tabija was built around 1550 (this opinion is founded on the information given by the travel writer Katarino Zeno) and was destroyed during the time of Vratnik City's construction when a new fort was erected in its place.

According to another opinion, a fortress existed in the place of Bijela Tabija during the Middle Ages and it was not bigger than the usual medieval defence fortresses that protected open settlements in their vicinity. Since it is confirmed that there was a medieval settlement Tornik on the site of today's Sarajevo, it is safe to presume that this settlement must have had a fort which protected it.

Bijela Tabija's location which overlooks the entire Sarajevo valley is ideal for situating a mediaeval fortress. It was a fortress with a rectangular base, accompanied with four square-based towers at each of its corners and a fifth above the entrance gate. This shape classifies it as a building from the late 14th or early 15th century, which is exactly the time when the medieval settlement on the site of today's Sarajevo is first mentioned in written documents.

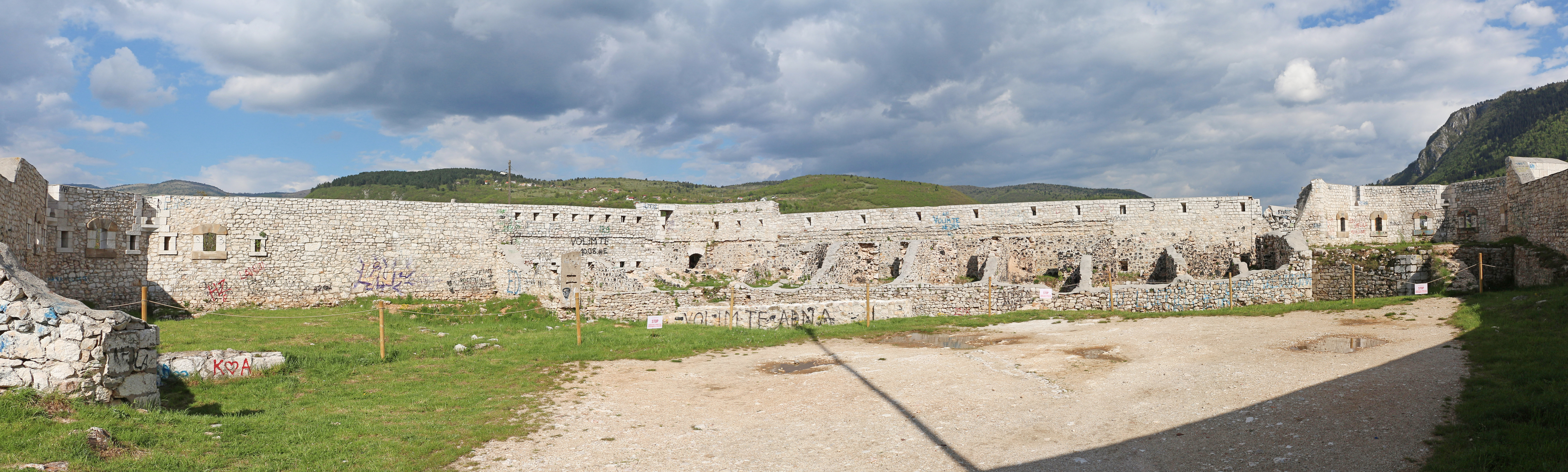
Interior view of the castle ruins of Bijela Tabija

== Preservation and future plans ==
Prior to the Bosnian War of the 1990s, devastation inside the Bijela Tabija complex were the result of poor maintenance which caused the decaying and destruction. Furthermore, the site was endangered by stealing of its construction material (stone) and illegal housing in the contact zone caused the additional demolition of ramparts and surrounding area. During the several years of war Bijela Tabija was exposed to direct shelling of heavy weaponry.

Plans for a project of structural repairs, preservation, restoration and revitalization of Bijela Tabija to active use of this area are under way. Their goal is to establish Tabija as the permanent destination of Sarajevo's art scene and to include it as a tourist attraction which includes exhibition halls, shops, inns and various tourist businesses.

Bijela Tabija has been placed under legal protection as an object of cultural and historical heritage and listed under the Protected Monuments Register by Act of Municipal Court in Sarajevo on 9 September 1971.

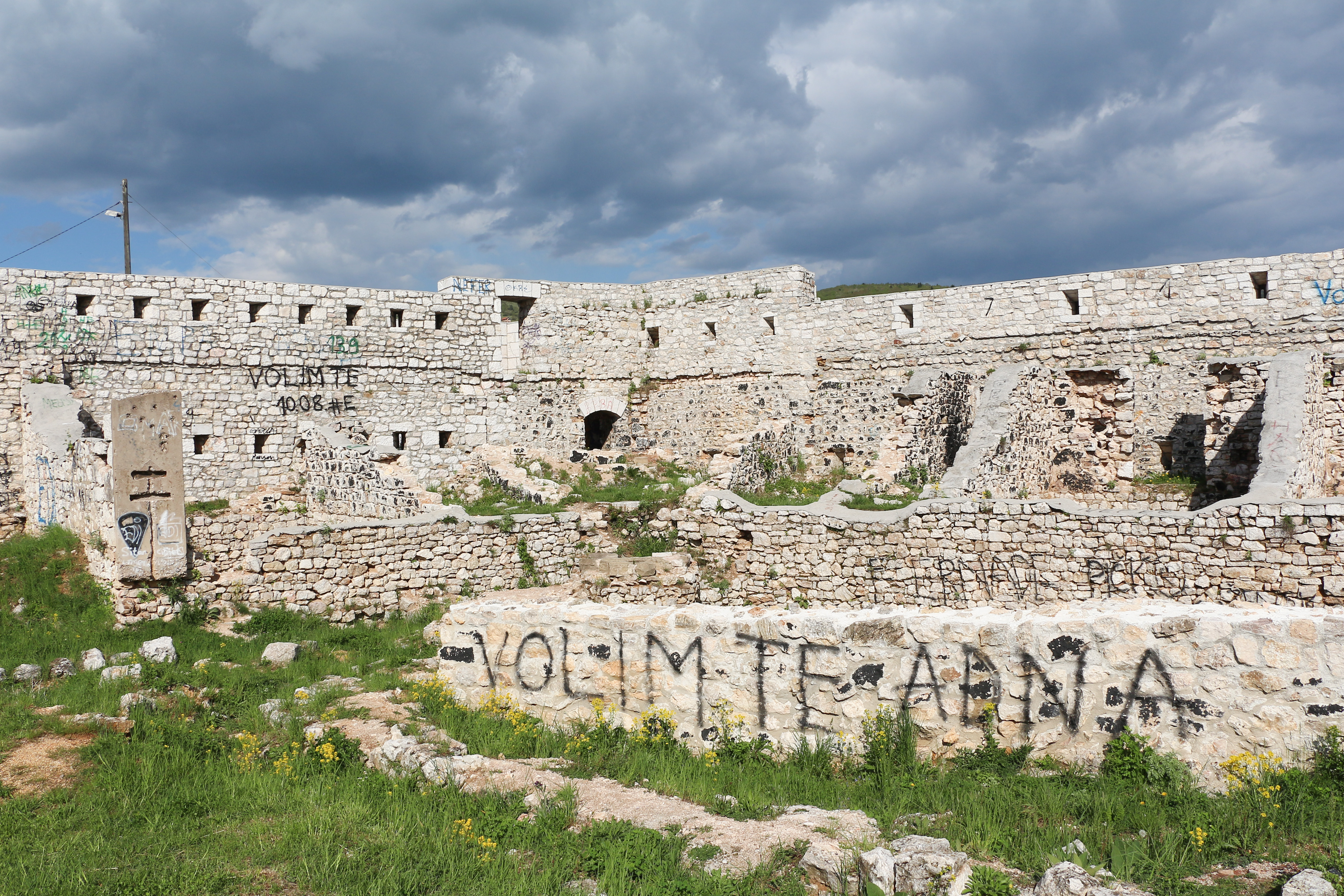
White fortress

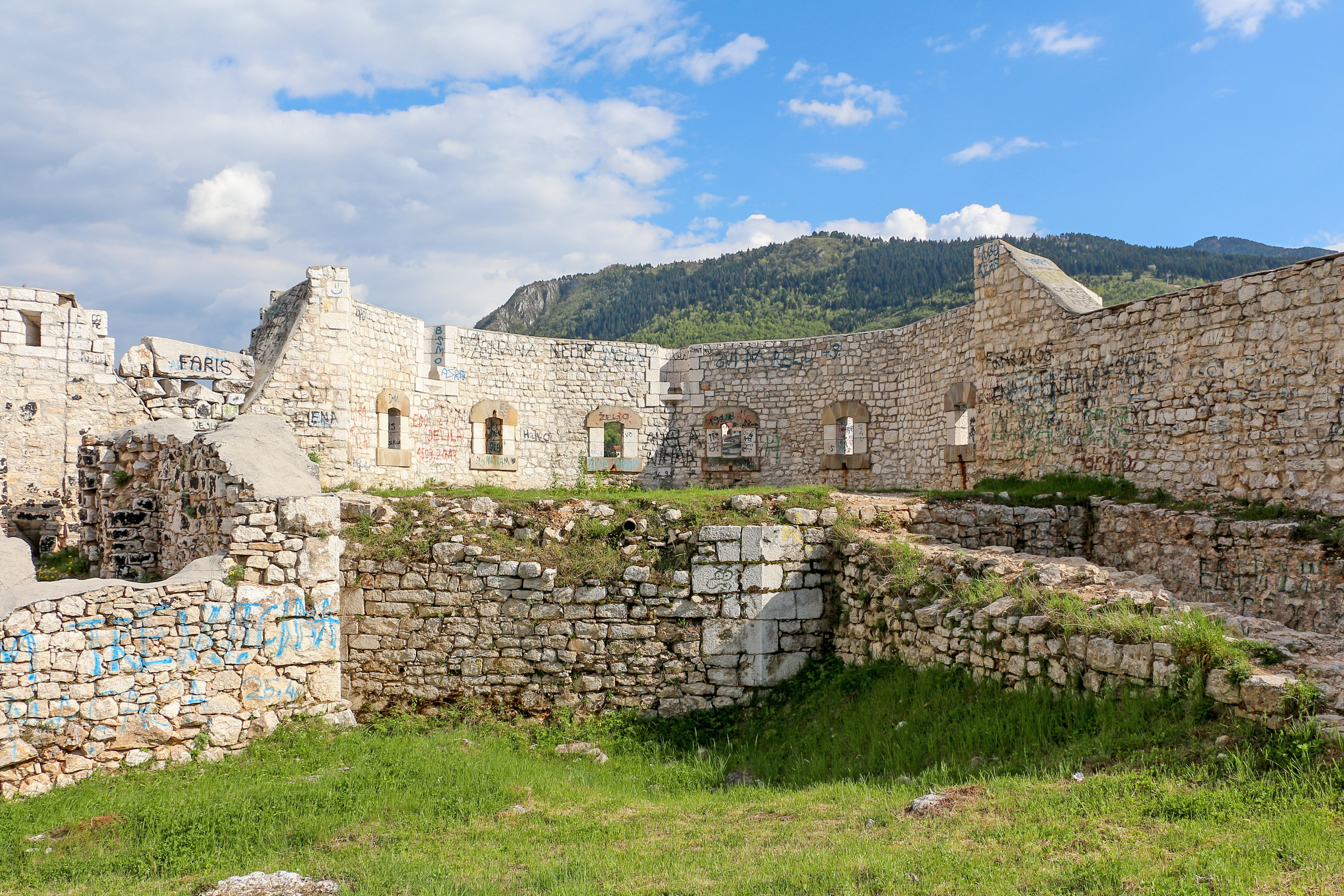
White fortress

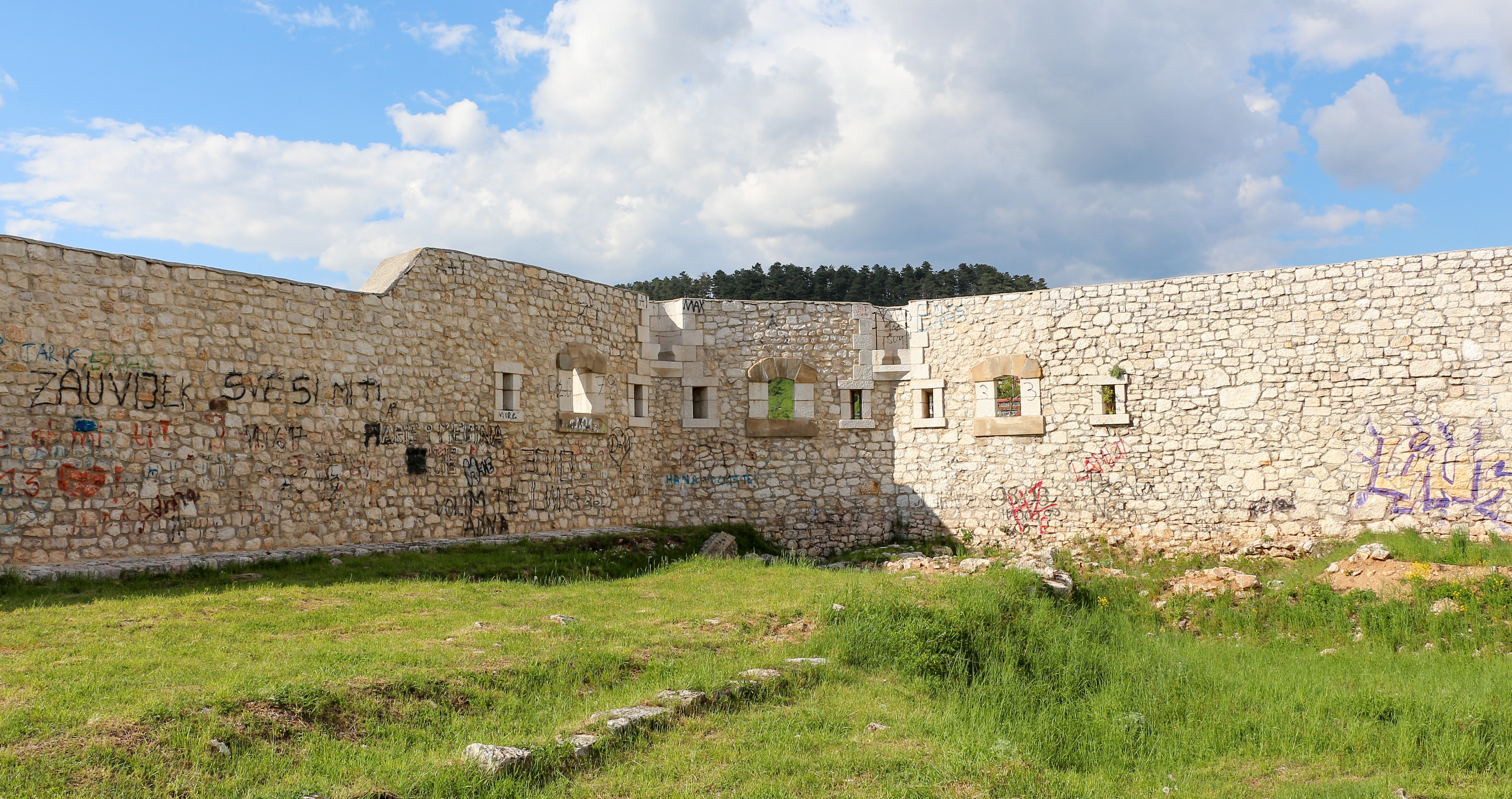
White fortress

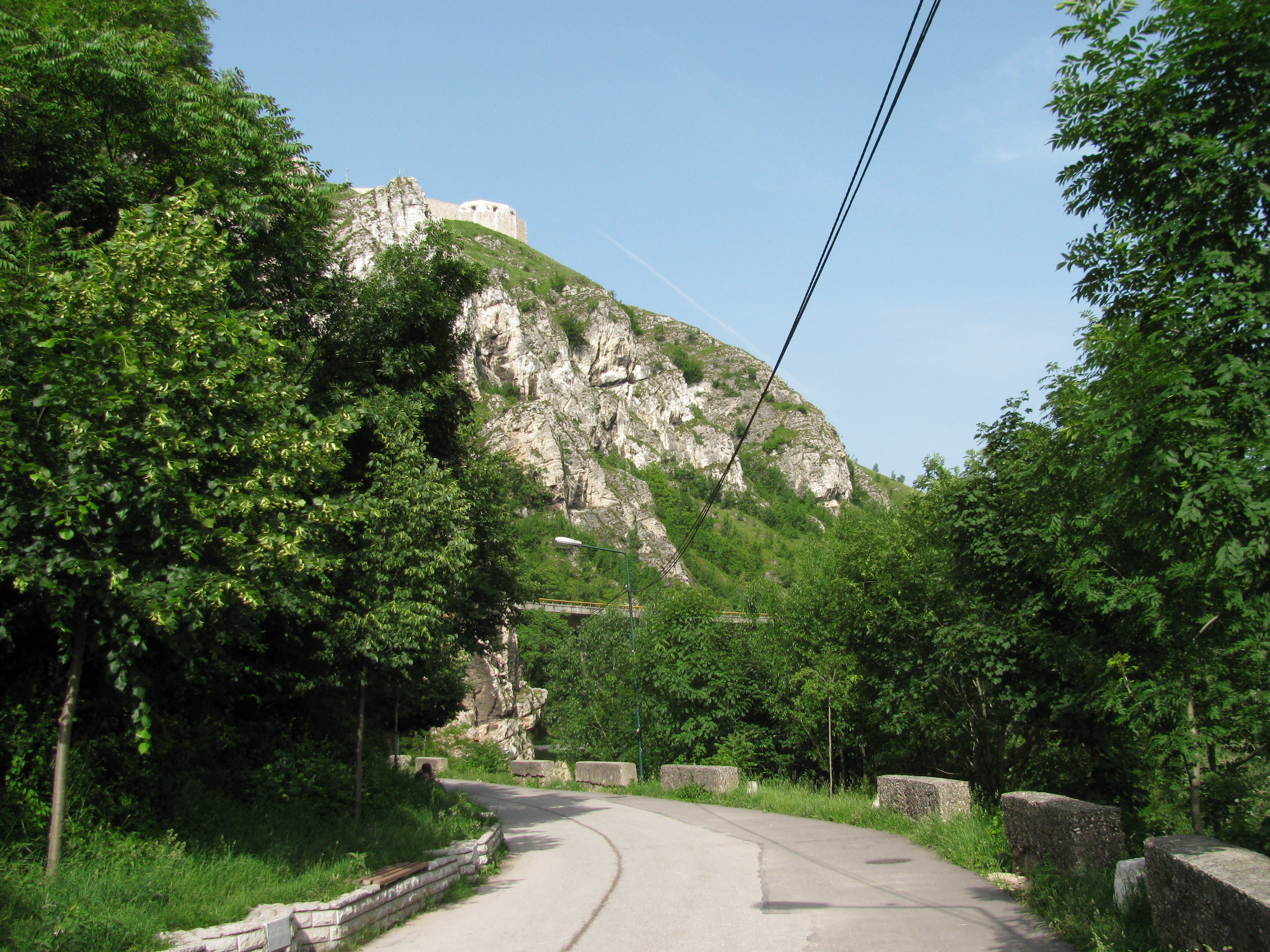
Bijela tabija from Bentbaša

== See also ==
- Žuta Tabija
- Vratnik
