= Sarajevo Youth Film Festival =

Annual festival in Bosnia and Herzegovina

- Location: Sarajevo, Bosnia and Herzegovina
- Founded: 2008; 18 years ago
- Language: International
- Website: www.omladinski.ba

The Sarajevo Youth Film Festival (Bosnian: Omladinski Film Festival Sarajevo / Омладински Филм Фестивал Сарајево), also known as OFF Sarajevo, is an annual film festival held in Sarajevo, Bosnia and Herzegovina. It is held in September and showcases feature, animated and short films from around the world. The main focus of the festival is on promoting young film directors and producers, student films and youth-themed films. OFF Sarajevo is a short professional film festival in Southeast Europe, focused on the work of young amateur and professional filmmakers.

== History ==
The festival was established by film professionals from Bosnia and Herzegovina with the goal of giving younger filmmakers from the Former Yugoslavia a wider platform to promote their work. It was quickly internationalized even further, bringing in authors from all of Europe, North America and Asia. The first edition of the festival was organized from 9 to 13 September 2008. Most of the events were of open-air type. Traditionally, Žuta tabija and the House of the Military in downtown Sarajevo were used as primary venues for the event. However, since OFF Sarajevo 2018, all of the events are held in Cinema City cinema near the ARIA Centar. On average 30 authors from 11 different countries are programmed per edition, with over 15,000 visitors each year. The average age of festival employees is 22, while the management is headed by Kenan Musić. The main feature film competition program is called Made for Open Air.

== Overview and mission ==
OFF Sarajevo serves as a platform for young filmmakers, where they present their work and participate in industry events, sponsors, distributors, and representatives from political, public, and cultural sectors. The festival emphasizes the regional and European short film scene, particularly student and professional short films, providing a platform for film screenings and industry activities.

== Program and events ==
Each year, OFF Sarajevo screens approximately 70 films across three competitive sections—OFF Shorts, OFF Generation Short, and OFF Generation Features. The festival also includes non-competitive categories, such as OFF Screen and OFF Retrospective, which offer audiences a chance to explore a broader range of cinematic work. Alongside film screenings, OFF organizes music events, co-production markets, and educational masterclasses, along with conferences and networking receptions.

== Cultural and economic impact ==
Held across five locations throughout Sarajevo, OFF Sarajevo attracts around 15,000 attendees annually, generating cultural tourism with over 1,000 overnight stays during its five-day duration. With an array of notable guests, including young actors from streaming platforms like Netflix, Amazon Prime, and HBO Max, OFF has established itself as Bosnia and Herzegovina’s second-largest film festival. This popularity drives both domestic and international interest, introducing audiences to short films and promoting festival culture among younger generations.

== Notable features ==
Each edition sees around 200 accredited attendees and numerous media representatives, including five prominent international outlets, covering the festival’s programs and events.

== Sections ==
Main Program: Short meter, short feature film

Main program is the selection of a short feature film. Within this selection are young film professionals with their short films created in their own production or production of their film schools. The Short Meter Selection at the 11th edition of Youth Film Festival Sarajevo will present a 20 shorts.

Competition Program: Creative, art and experimental film

One of the competition selections of the festival is the selection of a short experimental, art and creative film. This selection in 2019 will present 5 films.

Competition Program: OFF Generation

"OFF Generation" is the old program of the Festival but with a new name. As in previous years, this program will present 5 films that are designed for the young generation of 15–26 years old and directed by former or recent film academy students.

Special Screenings: Family movies

One of the goals of the Youth Film Festival Sarajevo, from the outset, was to create unique cinema locations and special atmosphere during screenings at open-air cinemas. For this reason, OFF continues with projections of 5 family, feature films that will be screened as part of the Open Cinema at Žuto tabija, OS BiH and as part of the new open air venue of the festival in the center of Sarajevo - OFF Drive in cinema.

== OFF Pro Film Market ==
OFF Pro Film Market is the Telemach Youth Film Festival Sarajevo program intended for young film professionals. OFF Pro Film Market is held for four days as part of each edition of the Festival. It consists of a series of programs, some of which are also available to the public. The goal of OFF’s industry program is to empower new filmmakers, especially those with debut or new projects, by offering them various benefits through the Festival’s educational and development programs. As part of OFF Pro Film Market, the most important initiative that festival presents is OFF Co-pro + Let’s produce – a unique co-production market, intended for projects in development for short films. OFF Co-pro is also the largest co-production market for short films in the Former Yugoslavia, the only such in Bosnia and Herzegovina, with a financial fund and a set of logistical services for all stages of production.

== Gallery ==
Old logo
