= Žuta Tabija =

Cannon fortress

Yellow Fortress
- Žuta Tabija, Жута Табија
- Part of Walled City of Vratnik
- Jekovac, Sarajevo, Bosnia and Herzegovina
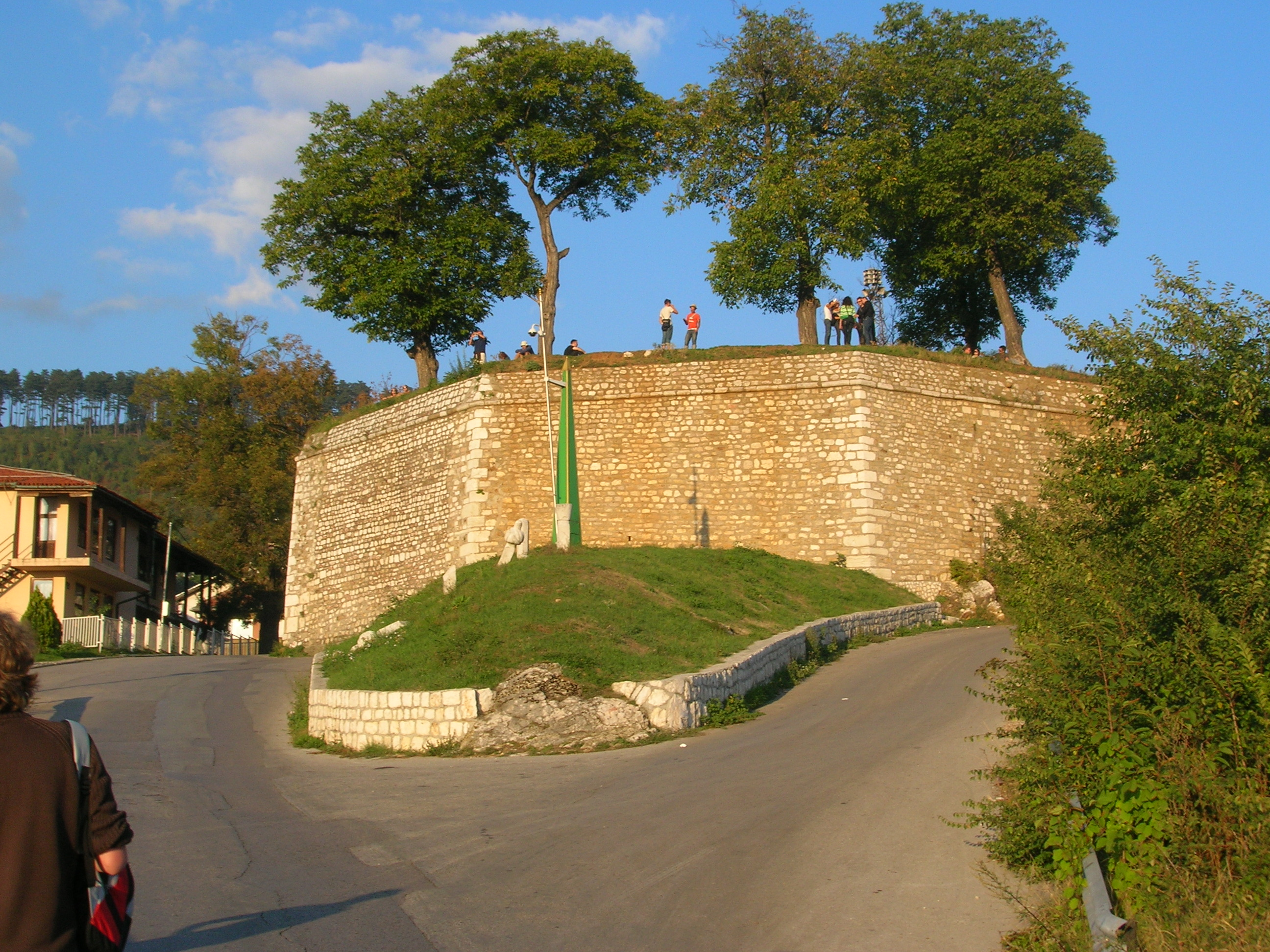
- Žuta Tabija

Site information
- Type: Cannon fort

Location
- Coordinates: 43.861480°N 18.437741°E

Site history
- Built: 1727–1739
- Built by: Ahmed-paša Rustempašić Skopljak
- Materials: Sandstone

The Yellow Fortress or Yellow Bastion (Bosnian, Croatian and Serbian: Žuta Tabija, Serbian Cyrillic: Жута Табија) is a cannon fortress at the entrance of the "Walled City of Vratnik". It was built between 1727 and 1739 in area called Jekovac, close to the Jajce Barracks and the Jekovac water reservoir. It served as one of the defense points against the Austro-Hungarian troops in 1878. The fortress was damaged and rebuilt several times. The most recent renovation took place in 1998.

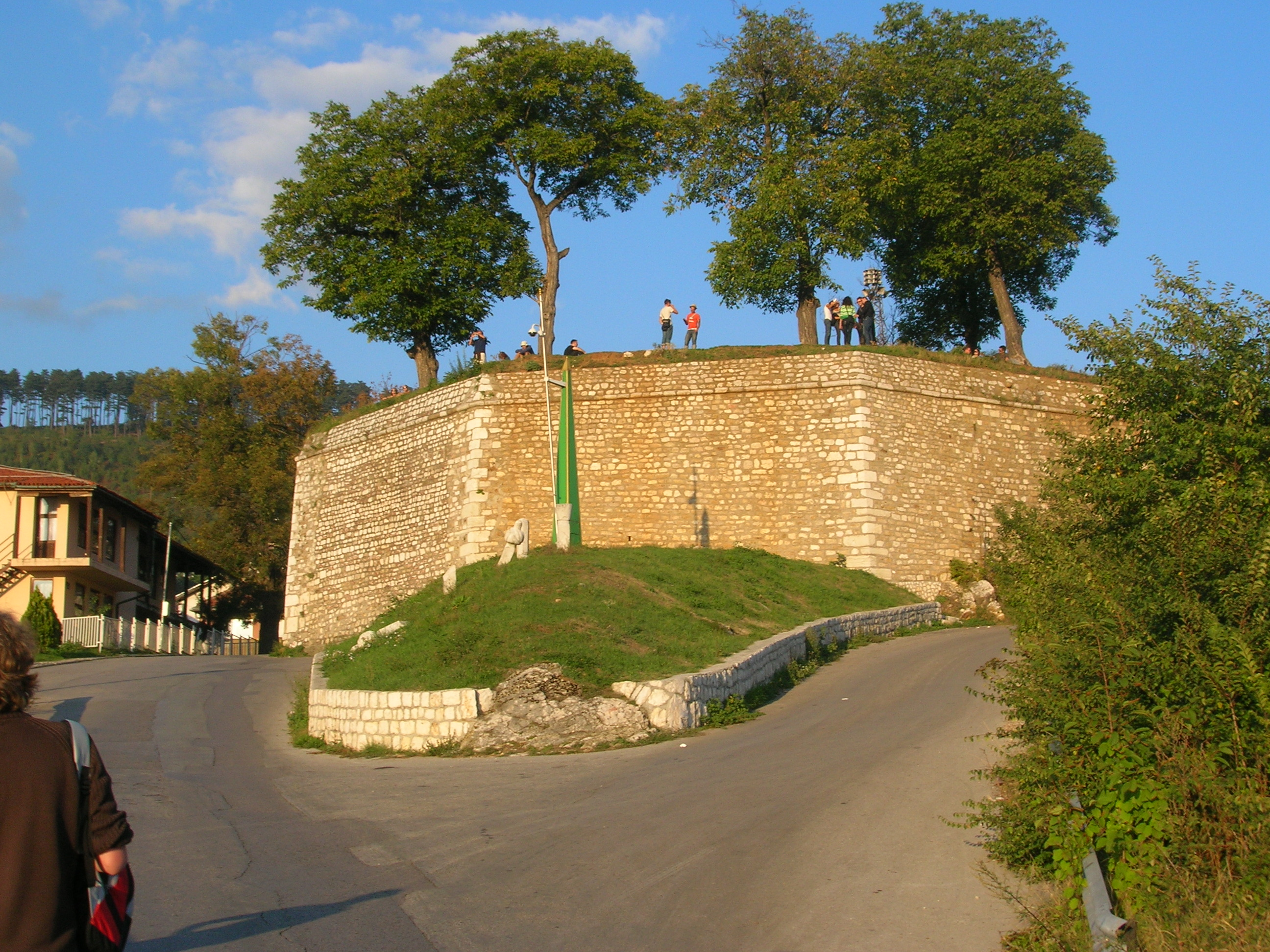
Žuta tabija

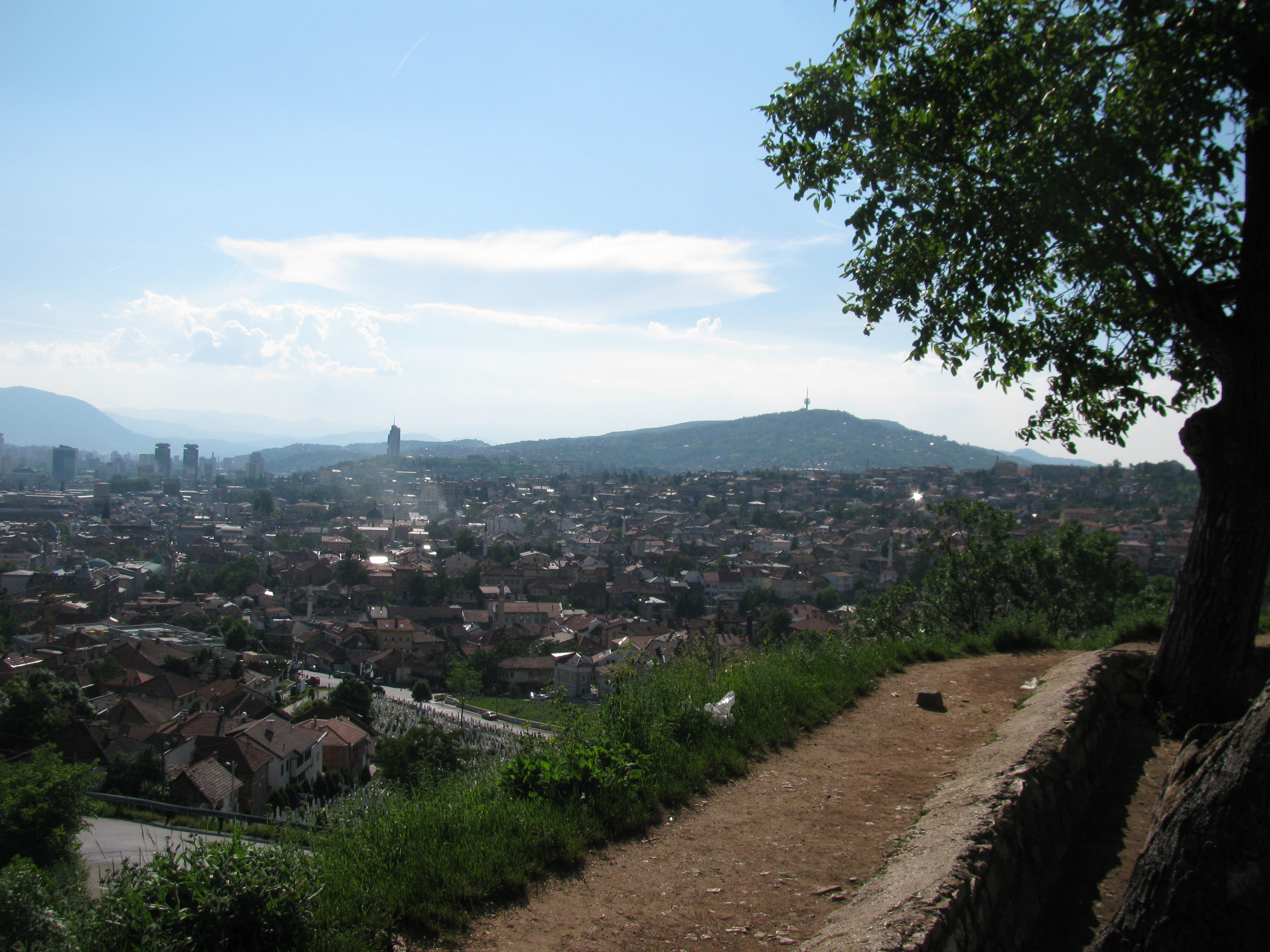
View of Sarajevo from Zuta tabija

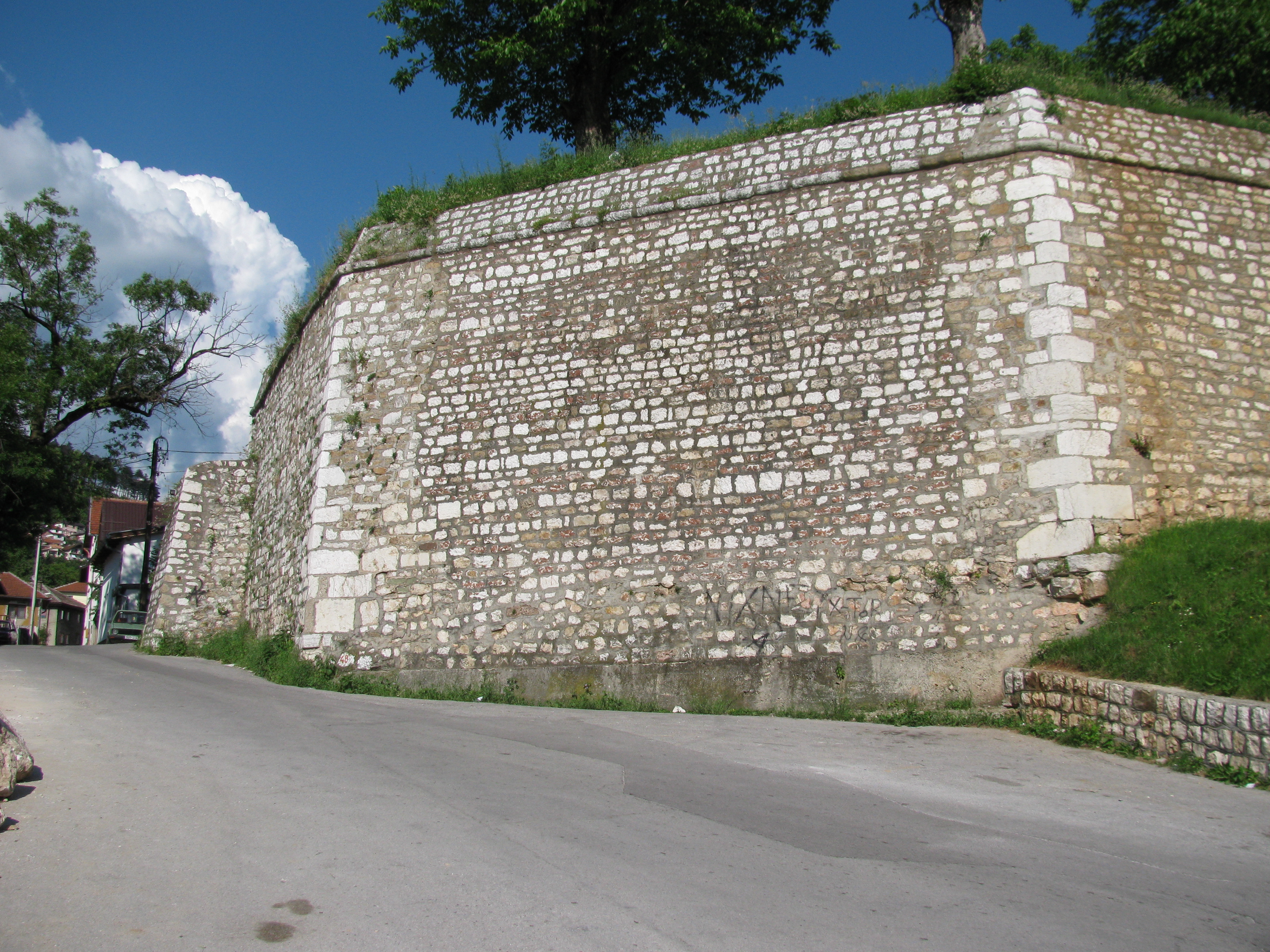
Yellow Fortress Walls

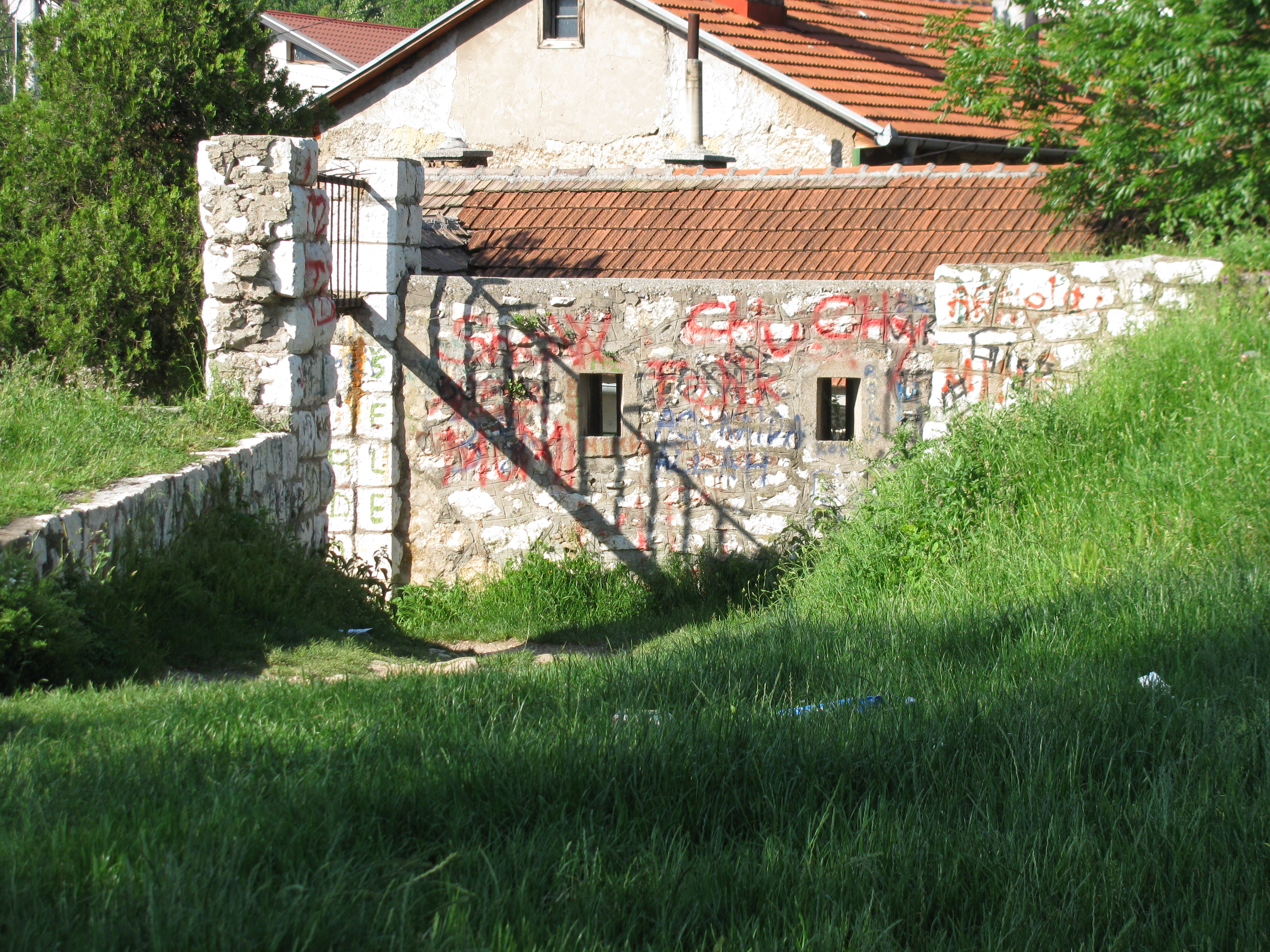
Entrance into Žuta tabija (2010)

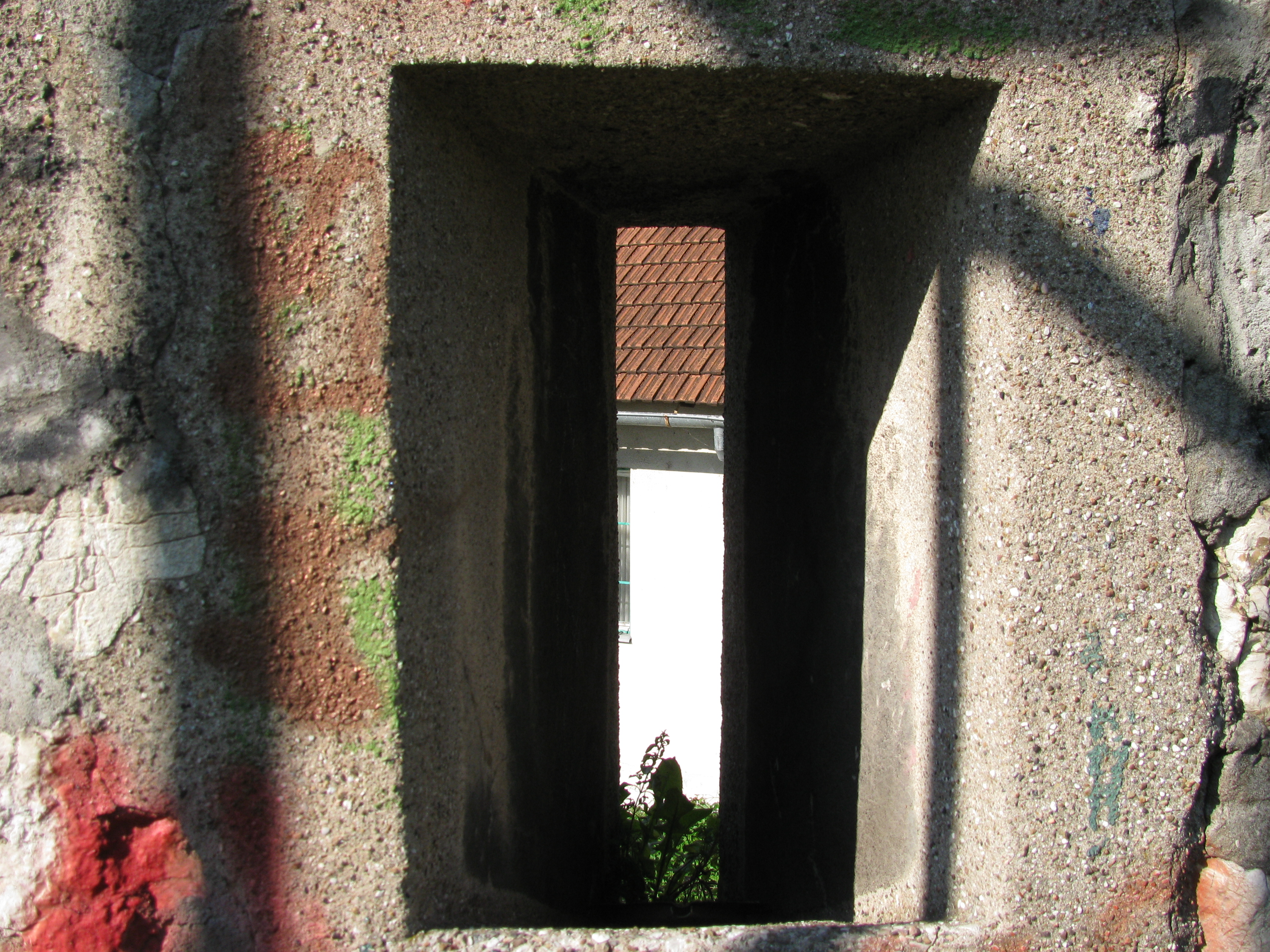
Windows of Žuta tabija

== See also ==
- Bijela Tabija
- Vratnik
