= Mirjana Emina Majić =

Croatian writer, poet and translator (1932–2021)

Mirjana Emina Majić (3 September 1932 – 5 August 2021) was a Croatian writer, poet and translator. She lived and worked in Australia.

== Background ==
Mirjana Emina Majić was born in Slatina, Kingdom of Yugoslavia, on 3 September 1932. During the 1970s she emigrated to Australia, where she published numerous collections of her poetry as well as contributing to anthologies of poetry in Australia and the United States. Her poetry has also appeared in Croatian-language newspapers both in Australia and overseas, including Spremnost. She was one of the contributors to Many Voices, for which she provided a short essay on Croatian poetry. Majić was Secretary of the Australian Croatian Literature Society and was a Migrant Teacher from the early 1980s.

Majić died in Sydney on 5 August 2021, at the age of 88.

== Works ==
Majić wrote 26 works. She translated numerous works of Croatian authors in English, such as poetry collection Dubrovniče, diko (Dubrovnik, our pride) from Pavao Despot.

Selected translations

- Croatian Word (Hrvatska riječ) – translation of an unknown author, appears in Mirrors in the Shadow
- Oh! Gospic, Our Impregnable Tower (Hrvatska si kremen kula) – translation of an unknown author, appears in Mirrors in the Shadow
- Two Loving Homelands (Dvije domovine) – translation of an unknown author, appears in Mirrors in the Shadow and Western Galaxy

Selected poems

- Hrvatsko srdce – srdcu hrvatskome – devoted to Ante Žanetić, Croatian footballer
- I Love You (Ja ljubim te) – appears in Mirrors in the Shadow
- The Moon Is Shining – appears in The Opening of Borders

Poetry collections

- Pravaška zora svanuti mora, 1991 – devoted to The Croatian Party of Rights
- Orlovi Hrvatske: 50 obljetnica uspostave Nezavisne Države Hrvatske (en: Croatian Eagles: The 50th Anniversary of the Establishment of the Independent State of Croatia), 1991, published by the Hrvatsko Dramsko Literarno Društvo Mile Budak, – devoted to the World War II fascist puppet state called the Independent State of Croatia
- Čarobni dragulj Slavonije, 1992
- Za tobom Boko suzno moje oko, 1995
- Posavino, naša rano ljuta, 1995
- Bleiburg 1945–1995 : posvećeno 50- obljetnici Bleiburga, 1995 – devoted to the 50th anniversary of the Bleiburg repatriations
- Junak vjesnik proljeća, 1999
- Love Is a Rose, 2001
- Agony of Two Gentle Souls, 2003
- Suze roni Hrvatica vila, 2003
- Nespominjani i zaboravljen, 2009
- Sokol kliče sa Ivan Planine, 2009
- Eminin javor, 2011
- Ratnik svjetlosti, 2011

She also published prose work Hero Messenger of Spring (1995) and drama Rasplamsana vatra iz daljine (2010).
