= Emina Kamberović =

Bosnian ballerina and professor

Emina Minka Kamberović
- Born: October 15, 1945 (age 80)
- Education: Saint Petersburg Conservatory
- Occupations: Ballerina, educator
- Employer: Sarajevo National Theatre
- Awards: Sixth of April Sarajevo Award

Emina Minka Kamberović (born 1945 in Sarajevo, Bosnia) is a former ballerina and ballet professor.

== Education and career ==
Kamberović was born in Sarajevo, near the National Theatre Sarajevo, and lived in the building overlooking at the theatre square, today Susan Sontag Square. She studied ballet in Sarajevo and Saint Petersburg Conservatory in Saint Petersburg. She was a prima ballerina of the National Theater in Sarajevo. Emina Kamberović founded the Sarajevo ballet school and is also the director. She is an assistant in theaters in Sarajevo and Zurich in Switzerland with Uwe Scholz.

She was an assistant to Natalia Dudinskaya and Konstantin Sergeyev. She taught ballet for 35 years, the last 15 years or so she was a teacher of ballet and repertoire at the first "state" professional ballet school in Zurich. She is also a guest teacher in various cities in Europe. Today she is retired and teaches as a guest teacher in private dance schools in Zurich.

She is a recipient of the Sixth of April Sarajevo Award and the July 27 Award.

At the 2022 Ballet Fest Sarajevo, Kamberović's career was a main theme for the 22 September exhibition "Veliki format" by Edina Papo, hosted by Novi Hram Gallery in Sarajevo.
