= InterDance Fest =

Dance festival in Sarajevo, Bosnia

- Status: active
- Genre: Dance festival
- Location: Sarajevo
- Country: Bosnia and Herzegovina
- Years active: 2014 - present
- Website: interdancefest.com

The InterDance Fest is the largest contemporary dance festival in Southeastern Europe. It is held in Sarajevo, Bosnia and Herzegovina. The festival was established in 2010 by the Aster Dance Club in cooperation with the Berlin Dance Institute, the World DanceSport Federation and the MTV Dance Europe television network. It is open to contestants from the ages of 6 to 50, but also showcases non-competitive performers above the age of 50. It consists of competitive and non-competitive programmes that include Hip Hop, Jazz Dance, Street dance, Disco, Breakdancing, West Coast Swing, Electric Boogie, Salsa, Argentine tango, Mambo, Cha-cha-cha, Majorette performances, Cheerleading, Zumba, Belly Dance and others. The festival also hosts the European Salsa Championships. The 2017 edition hosted over 4,000 performers representing 84 international dance clubs from 46 different countries.

== History ==
The Aster Dance Club was founded in 1986 in Sarajevo, then part of SFR Yugoslavia and was named after American dancer, choreographer and actor, Fred Astaire. It was originally part of the Slobodan Princip "Seljo" Student Cultural Club. The club was a founding member of the Bosnian Dance Federation, but ceased to exist in 2000. In 2014 the club was reestablished by former members. That same year it founded the festival in cooperation with the acclaimed Berlin Dance Institute, the World DanceSport Federation and MTV Dance Europe. In 2017, the organizers signed a cooperation agreement with the 2019 European Youth Olympic Winter Festival.

== Format ==
The festival is organized in April and lasts for three days. Its format is 19 competitive and 7 non-competitive dance programmes that are held for the first two days of the festival and represent contemporary dance styles from four different continents. The third day, organized in cooperation with the International Dance Organization, is reserved for programmes that fall under performing arts: tap dance, musical theatre, contemporary ballet, lyrical dance and concert dance. Numerous panels of international judges decide on the winner of each competitive programme.
