= Sarajevo Evenings of Music =

Annual instrumental music festival in Sarajevo, Bosnia

- Genre: Contemporary classical music
- Dates: 9-18 May
- Locations: Sarajevo, Bosnia and Herzegovina
- Years active: 1994 – present
- Organiser: Music Art Foundation
- Website: www.maf.ba

The Sarajevo Evenings of Music (SVEM) is an international multi-day contemporary instrumental music festival which annually takes place in Sarajevo, Bosnia and Herzegovina. It was established by the Music Arts Foundation and is held in May. UNESCO has said of this and related events, "These festivals have special programme profiles, long tradition and good production and organization conditions," and that they have "special importance for the culture of the Federation of Bosnia and Herzegovina and Bosnia."
