= Smile of Sarajevo Theatre Festival =

- Location: Sarajevo, Bosnia and Herzegovina
- Founded: 2017
- Founded by: Nedžad Podžić
- Selector: Ermin Sijamija
- Festival date: May

The Smile of Sarajevo Theatre Festival (Bosnian: Festival komedije Osmijeh Sarajeva / Фестивал комедије Осмијех Сарајева) was an international comedy theatre festival that is annually held in Sarajevo, Bosnia and Herzegovina. It was established in 2017 by a team of theatre professionals headed by Nedžad Podžić "Poćko", and ran until 2020. The festival is organized in May and lasts for 9 days. It showcased comedy theatre performances from Bosnia and Herzegovina and the Former Yugoslavia.
