= SOS Design Festival =

- Genre: Art festival
- Date: October
- Frequency: annual
- Locations: Sarajevo, Bosnia and Herzegovina
- Years active: 2012 - present
- Area: Bosnia and Herzegovina

The SOS Design Festival is an annual graphics and product design festival held in Sarajevo, Bosnia and Herzegovina. It was established by the Academy of Fine Arts in cooperation with the National Gallery of Bosnia and Herzegovina and the International Council of Design. It is primarily an educational platform, while also being as an exhibitory event that was originally conceived by the students of the Department of Graphic and Product design of the Academy of Fine Arts in Sarajevo.

It is the largest student product design festival in the Balkans and consists of lectures, workshops, exhibitions, book promotions and PechaKucha Nights, providing an opportunity for students of design and related fields from Bosnia and Herzegovina and other former Yugoslav countries to acquaint themselves with knowledge, new methods, trends and works of leading modern designers. It also provides a new form of supplementary education to students and professionals in the field of design and encourages the development and promotion of design in the former Yugoslavia.

The festival lasts for five days and hosts numerous international guests, speakers, lecturers and artists. Guests have included Milton Glaser, Ian Anderson, Dick Bruna, April Greiman, Peter Saville, Roberto Baldazzini, Mirko Ilić, Oscar Mariné and others.
