= Emina Yamaguchi =

Japanese professional shogi player

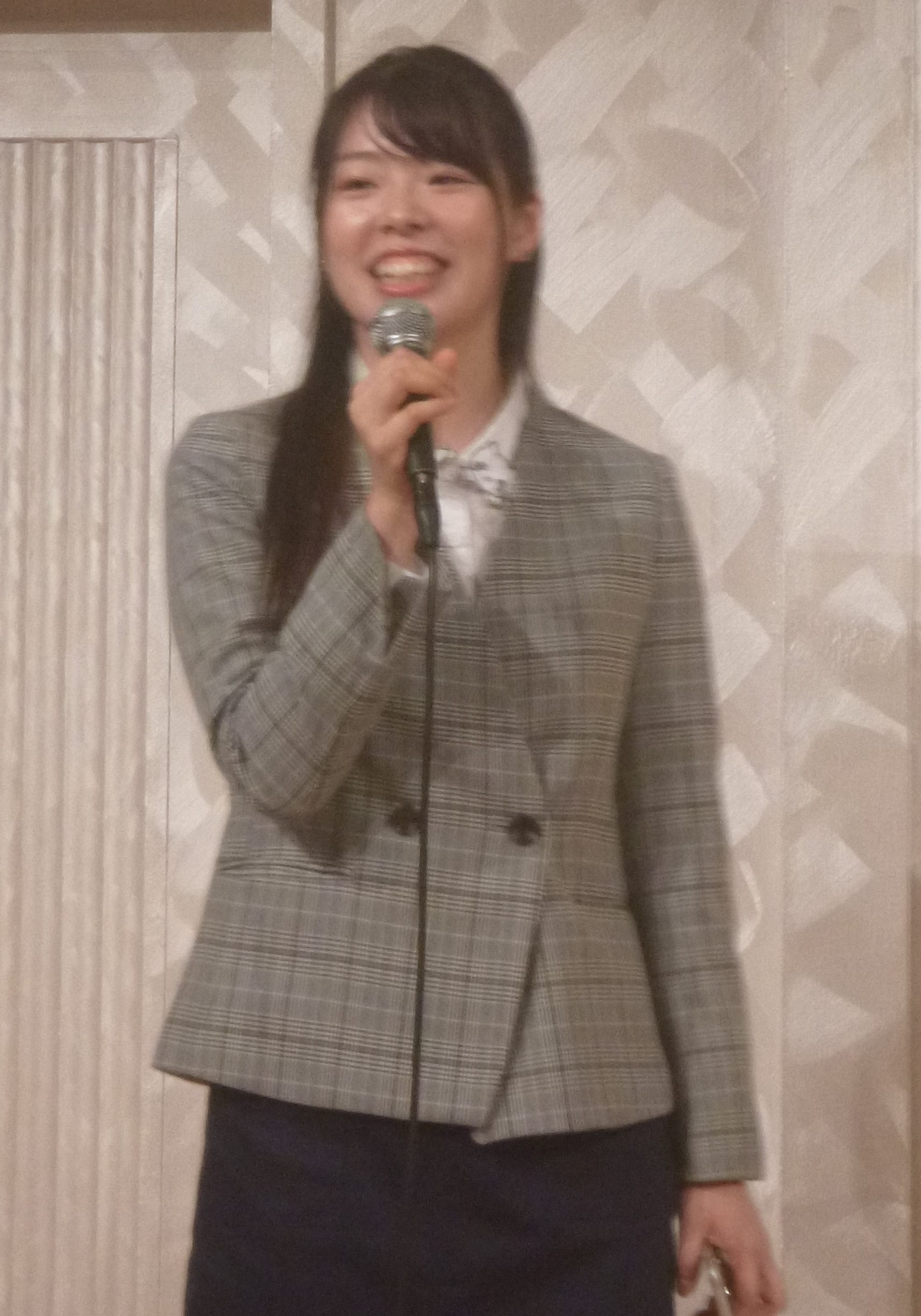
- Yamaguchi at a shogi event in September 2019
- Native name: 山口絵美菜
- Born: May 4, 1994 (age 31)
- Hometown: Miyakonojō, Miyazaki Prefecture, Japan

Career
- Achieved professional status: April 21, 2016 (aged 21)
- Badge Number: W-55
- Rank: Women's 1-kyū
- Retired: March 30, 2022 (aged 27)
- Teacher: Nobuo Mori (7-dan)
- Career record: 27–63 (.300)

Websites
- JSA profile page

Emina Yamaguchi (山口 絵美菜, Yamaguchi Emina; born May 4, 1994) is a former Japanese women's professional shogi player who achieved the rank of 1-kyū.

== Women's shogi professional ==
On March 30, 2022, the Japan Shogi Association announced that it had accepted Yamaguchi's notification that she was leaving the association and would no longer be competing as a women's professional. Yamaguchi played 90 games as a women's professional; she won 27 and lost 63 for a winning percentage of 30 percent.

=== Promotion history ===
Yamaguchi's promotion history was as follows:

- 2014, October 1: 3-kyū
- 2016, April 21: 2-kyū
- 2016, August 13: 1-kyū

Note: All ranks are women's professional ranks.

== Personal life ==
Yamaguchi graduated from the Faculty of Letters of Kyoto University in 2018.
