= FEDU =

Annual children's art festival in Sarajevo, Bosnia

- Location: Sarajevo, Bosnia and Herzegovina
- Founded: 2015; 10 years ago
- Language: International
- Website: www.fedu.ba

FEDU (Bosnian: Festival dječije umjetnosti; Фестивал дјечије умјетности) is an annual children's art festival held in Sarajevo, Bosnia and Herzegovina. It is held in May, lasts for six days and showcases extensive performing arts, literary and music programs from around the world. Furthermore, it organizes numerous workshops for children between the ages of 6 and 14. The festival was established in 2015 by a team headed by children's writer Fahrudin Kučuk in cooperation with the government of the Sarajevo Canton. The main festival venue is the Sarajevo National Theatre. The festival has hosted productions from over 20 countries. It is the only international children's art festival in the Balkans.

== Format ==
The festival has a competition format that includes three main programmes: Musical, Theatrical and Fairy tale, while also running smaller programmes for puppetry, interactive education, costume design and fine arts. The musical programme holds both choir and solo singing sub-programmes as well as instrumental programmes broken down into range groups. The theatrical programme hosts Bosnian and international children's theatre companies with the productions being showcased in the Sarajevo National Theatre, the Kamerni teatar 55 and the Sarajevo Youth Theatre. The Fairy tale programme is a literary competition open to adults and it awards the best new children's fairy tale of the year. The awards ceremony is held in the Sarajevo National Theatre on the last day of the festival. It has hosted productions by the Stretford Children's Theatre, Silver Lake Children's Theatre Group, Young Spectator's Theatre, Puppet Theatre Mostar, Branko Mihaljević Children's Theatre and others.

== Venues ==
- Sarajevo National Theatre
- Kamerni teatar 55
- International Center for Children and Youth
- Bosnian National Theatre
- Sarajevo Youth Theatre
- Centar Municipality Hall
- Vijećnica
