= Garden of Dreams (Sarajevo) =

Event brand in Sarajevo, Bosnia

- Status: Active
- Genre: Electronic music
- Location: Sarajevo
- Country: Bosnia and Herzegovina
- Established: 2016
- Organiser: Garden Collective
- Website: gardenofdreams.ba

Garden of Dreams is an electronic music event management company in Sarajevo founded in 2016. It organizes electronic music events and is best known for its annual music festival.

== Garden of Dreams Festival ==
The Garden of Dreams Festival is an electronic music festival that was first held in 2019. In 2020 and 2021 the festival was held in an alternate format due to the global COVID19 pandemic. From 2022 to 2023, the festival's attendance increased from 4,500 people to 6,000 people. The 2023 festival featured artists including Tom Odell, DJ Antoine, Who See, Artan Lili, and Velahavle.

== Gallery ==
Garden of Dreams Festival, 2022.

Garden of Dreams, Svjetlost building, May 2023.

Garden of Dreams Festival, 2024.

Garden of Dreams, 2023.

Garden of Dreams, 2018.

Garden of Dreams, Vilsonovo šetalište, 2019.

Garden of Dreams, Hum Tower, 2023.
