= Kao nekad pred Božić =

Annual Christmas music festival in Sarajevo, Bosnia and Herzegovina

- Genre: Christmas carols, Christmas music
- Dates: 6 December
- Locations: Sarajevo, Bosnia and Herzegovina
- Years active: 1999 – present

Kao nekad pred Božić (English: As it used to be before Christmas) is an annual one-day Christmas music festival held in Sarajevo, Bosnia and Herzegovina. It was established in 1999 as a joint venture by Croatian and Catholic cultural and religious organizations in Bosnia and Herzegovina. The founder of this festival is Marijo Pejic. The festival is held in the Dom Mladih. It hosts numerous renowned church choirs, folklore groups and contemporary pop musicians. Guests and performers have included Goran Karan, Oliver Dragojević, Dražen Žerić, Klapa s Mora, Rajko Dujmić and others.

Apart from hosting a large Christmas music concert, the festival also hosts numerous folklore and cultural groups that present traditional folk dances and kolos from Bosnia and Herzegovina, Croatia and the diaspora.
