= Lutfest =

- Location: East Sarajevo, Bosnia and Herzegovina
- Founded: 1999
- Founded by: Vitomir Mitrić
- Selector: Vitomir Mitrić
- Festival date: May

Lutfest is an international puppetry festival held annually in East Sarajevo, Republika Srpska, and Bosnia and Herzegovina. It was established in 1999 and has subsequently become the premier festival of its kind in the Former Yugoslavia. The festival has hosted some of the world's most well known puppeteers, including Paul McGinnis, Bruce Lanoil, and Peter Schumann.
