= Sarajevo StreeAt Food Festival =

Street food festival in Sarajevo

- Status: active
- Genre: Food festival
- Frequency: Annually
- Location: Sarajevo
- Country: Bosnia and Herzegovina
- Years active: 2018 - present
- Founder: Pro Optimus Tours
- Website: ssff.ba

The Sarajevo StreeAt Food Festival (Bosnian: Festival ulične hrane Sarajevo / Фестивал уличне хране Сарајево) is an annual international street food festival held in Sarajevo, Bosnia and Herzegovina. It is held in July and August of every year and lasts for three weeks. The festival was established in 2018 by Pro Optimus Tours and is the only one of its kind in Bosnia and Herzegovina.

The festival's main venue is Alija Izetbegović Square in downtown Sarajevo where it presents both national and international street food showcased by over 100 different vendors. The festival's programme also includes nightly rock concerts, after-work parties, EDM sessions, cooking workshops for school children and adults, cuisine-themed open air film screenings, a cooking book trade fair and the filming of live cooking shows for television. The 2018 edition attracted over 60,000 visitors.
