= Croatian Party of Rights (set index) =

The Croatian Party of Rights (Croatian: Hrvatska stranka prava, HSP) is the name of a contemporary Croatian conservative political party which was founded in 1990 after the introduction of multi-party democracy in the country. It claims lineage to the historical party of the same name which was active between 1861 and 1929 and which advocated for the Croatian state right, a right to self-determination at the time when Croatia was part of Austria-Hungary and Kingdom of Yugoslavia.

There were other briefly active splinter parties with the same name in the early 20th century which often changed forms and merged with each other but were eventually all disbanded by 1929. Since the early 1990s and the foundation of the contemporary party a number of right-wing factions have also splintered from it or formed nationalist parties independently, using the name in some form, as they all claim to be the "true" adherents to the ideology of the original 19th-century party. In Croatia the name is usually taken to refer to either the historical party or the 1990 party as it is the only party to date carrying that name which managed to win seats in the Croatian Parliament. Smaller parties carrying the name generally receive marginal coverage in the local media even though they regularly run in both local and general elections.

In addition, some of these parties also operate similarly named branches in Bosnia and Herzegovina, usually on a nationalist platform promoting interests of Bosnian Croats and regularly running in the Bosnian general elections. Note that the native name of all these parties contains the word prava which is the both singular and plural genitive form of the word pravo (which in English means "right" - as in the "right to self-determination"). Because of this the name is regarded as a singular in Croatia (literally "Croatian Party of Right"), but commonly appears in English in the plural form, probably to distinguish it from the English term "Right" which is generally used for right-wing ideology. Nevertheless, both historical and contemporary parties carrying the name are considered representatives of the conservative, nationalist, or even far-right side of the political spectrum.

The name may thus refer to:

Historical parties

- Party of Rights (1861–1910) (Stranka prava, SP), influential historical party founded by Ante Starčević
- Frankists or formally the Pure Party of Rights (Čista stranka prava, ČSP), party that split from the Party of Rights in 1895
- Milinovci or formally the Starčević's Party of Rights (Starčevićeva stranka prava), party split from the Frankists in 1908
- Croatian Christian-Social Party of Rights established in 1906, merged with the Pure Party of Rights in 1910
- Starčević's Croatian Party of Rights, created in 1923, led by Mirko Košutić and Matej Mintas, fractioned in 1925 into:
  - Croatian People's Starčević Party, under Košutić, existed until 1927
  - Croatian Starčević Party, under Mintas and Milan Šafar, existed until 1928

Modern parties in Croatia

- Croatian Party of Rights (Hrvatska stranka prava, HSP), far-right political party established in 1990
  - Croatian Party of Rights 1861 (Hrvatska stranka prava 1861, HSP 1861), splinter party formed in 1995
  - Croatian Party of Rights Dr. Ante Starčević (Hrvatska stranka prava dr. Ante Starčević, HSP-AS), splinter party formed in 2009
- Croatian Pure Party of Rights (Hrvatska čista stranka prava, HČSP), party formed in 1992 claiming ideological lineage to the 1905 splinter party
- Autochthonous Croatian Party of Rights (Autohtona hrvatska stranka prava, A-HSP), far-right party founded in 2005

Modern parties in Bosnia and Herzegovina

- Croatian Party of Rights of Bosnia and Herzegovina (Hrvatska stranka prava Bosne i Hercegovine, HSP BiH), HSP branch in Bosnia and Herzegovina
- Croatian Party of Rights Dr. Ante Starčević of Bosnia and Herzegovina (Hrvatska stranka prava dr. Ante Starčević Bosne i Hercegovine, HSP AS), HSP AS branch in Bosnia and Herzegovina
