= Ballet Fest Sarajevo =

Annual ballet festival in Sarajevo, Bosnia

- Genre: Ballet festival
- Date: September
- Frequency: annual
- Locations: Sarajevo, Bosnia and Herzegovina
- Years active: 2010 - present
- Founder: Dina Papo
- Area: worldwide
- Organiser: Sarajevo National Theatre
- Website: baletfest.ba

Ballet Fest Sarajevo (Bosnian: Balet Fest Sarajevo; Serbo-Croatian Cyrillic: Балет Фест Сарајево) is an annual international ballet festival held in Sarajevo, Bosnia and Herzegovina. Established in 2010 by the Sarajevo National Theatre and the Sarajevo Ballet, the festival is dedicated to contemporary author choreography and showcases ballet performances from Southeastern Europe. It is the only ballet festival in Bosnia and Herzegovina.

== History ==
Ballet Fest Sarajevo was established in 2010 by the Sarajevo National Theatre and the Sarajevo Ballet, under the artistic direction of Edina Papo. The festival was conceived to promote and develop the art of ballet in Bosnia and Herzegovina, with a particular focus on contemporary author choreography.

Over the years, Ballet Fest Sarajevo has hosted numerous performances and workshops. Notably, the 2013 edition opened with a performance by "Shut UP & Dance," choreographed by Ronald Savković and produced by the Ivan Zajc Croatian National Theatre from Rijeka. It also featured a domestic production of Mare Nostru by the Sarajevo National Theatre and a performance of Ko to tamo peva by the Belgrade National Theatre, choreographed by Staša Zurovac.

Carmen, choreographed by Dina Papo. Nataša Gaponko, September 2021.

In 2020, the festival adapted to the global COVID-19 pandemic by presenting its 11th edition in an online format. This edition featured a repertoire of classical and contemporary ballet performances by soloists and ensembles from Slovakia, Romania, North Macedonia, Serbia, and Bosnia and Herzegovina.

== Locations ==
The festival's events are primarily held at the Sarajevo National Theatre. This venue serves as the central hub for performances and other festival activities.

== Gallery ==
Dance With Mozart, choreographed by Nermina Damian. Amina Sulejmanagić, Albina Huskić and Lejla Bajramović, September 2021.

Skandereg, Bitef Dance Company, choreographed by Isidora Stanišić. September 2023.

Slovak National Theatre performance at Sarajevo Ballet Festival, 2024.

Dina Papo and Jakob Finci, 2023.

== See also ==
- Sarajevo National Theatre
- List of festivals in Sarajevo
