= Beton Fest =

Former art festival in Sarajevo, Bosnia

- Status: active
- Genre: Art festival
- Location: Sarajevo
- Country: Bosnia and Herzegovina
- Years active: 2012 - 2016

Beton Fest was an international 3D street art festival held between 2012 and 2016 in Sarajevo, Bosnia and Herzegovina. It was held in July and each edition lasted for five days, bringing in international street artists from all over the world. It was established in 2012 by the arts association Progres in cooperation with the Academy of Fine Arts, Sarajevo. Apart from showcasing 3D street art, it also organized the Beton Music Stage which holds concerts and open-air parties for the duration of the festival. It was the only 3D street art festival in Southeastern Europe and has hosted many renowned street artists such as Vera Bugatti, Giovanna la Pietra, Tony Cuboliquido, Manuel Bastante and others.
