= Emina Soljanin =

Electrical engineer

Emina Soljanin is a Distinguished Researcher at Bell Labs who was named Fellow of the Institute of Electrical and Electronics Engineers (IEEE) in 2014 for contributions to coding theory and coding schemes for transmission and storage systems.

== Education and career ==
Soljanin received her European Diploma from the University of Sarajevo in 1986 and then got her PhD and MS from Texas A&M University in 1989 and 1994 respectively, all of which were in electrical engineering. During her studies, she worked in the Energoinvest Company in Bosnia where she was developing optimization algorithms and software for power system control. After graduation from Texas A&M in 1994, Soljanin joined Bell Labs in Murray Hill, New Jersey and currently serves there as a Distinguished Member of Technical Staff in the Mathematics of Networks and Communications research department. From 1990 to 1992, Soljanin served as a technical proofreader and from 1997 to 2000 served as associate editor for Coding Techniques for the IEEE Transactions on Information Theory. In 2008, Soljanin became a visiting researcher at the École Polytechnique Fédérale de Lausanne and is currently serves as co-chair for the DIMACS Special Focus on Computational Information Theory and Coding. Soljanin is a member of the editorial board of the Journal on Applicable Algebra in Engineering, Communication and Computing (AAECP) and a member of the Board of Governors of the IEEE Information Theory Society.
