= Vratnik (Sarajevo) =

Neighborhood in Sarajevo, Bosnia and Herzegovina

Vratnik Вратник
- Neighborhood
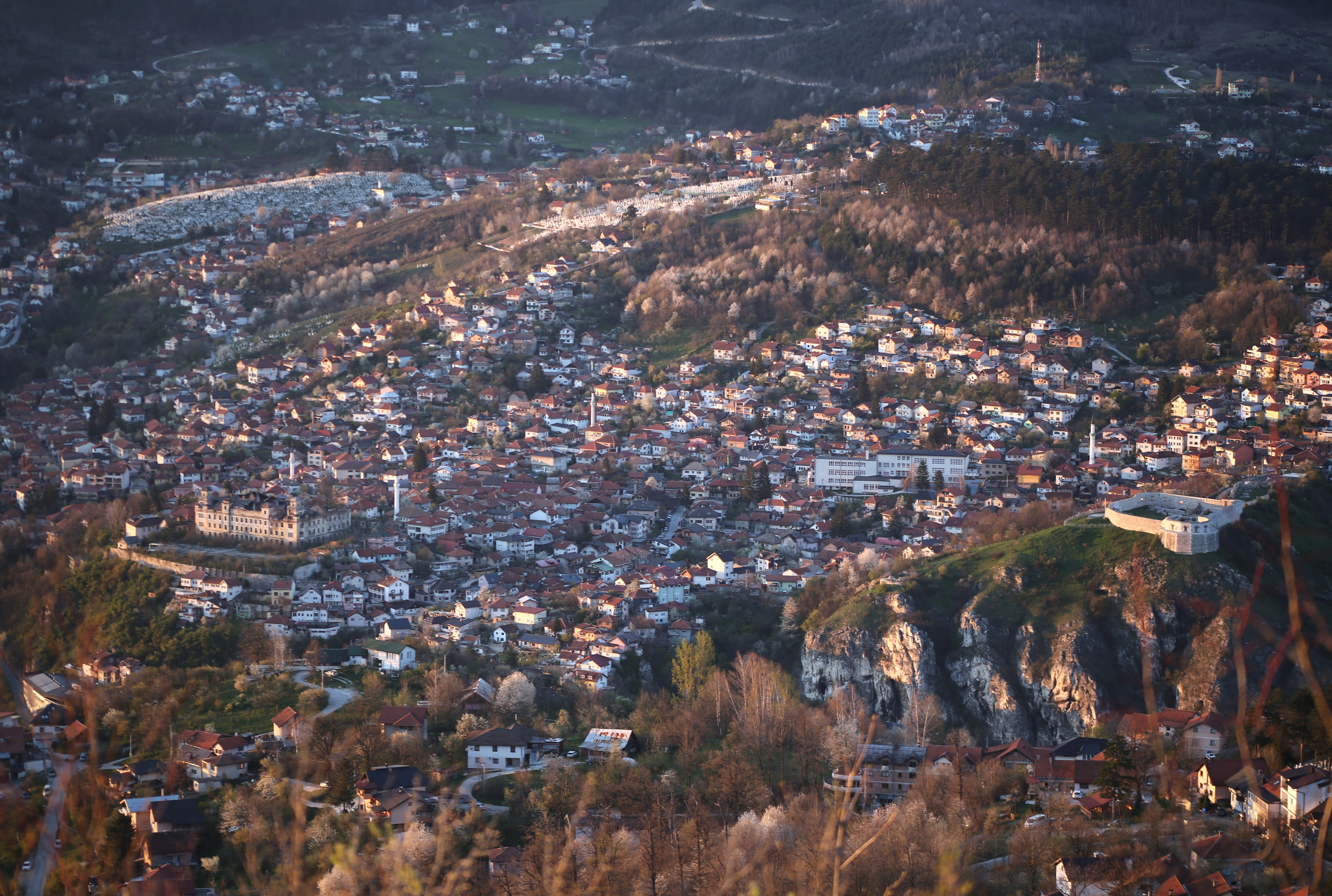

- Walled city of Vratnik within Sarajevo, Bosnia and Herzegovina
- Coordinates: 43.8623658°N 18.440702°E
- Country: Bosnia and Herzegovina
- Entity: Federation of Bosnia and Herzegovina
- Canton: Sarajevo Canton
- City: Sarajevo
- Municipality: Stari Grad, Sarajevo
- Time zone: UTC+1 (CET)
  - Summer (DST): UTC+2 (CEST)
- Area code: +387

Vratnik (Cyrillic: Вратник), also known as Stari grad Vratnik (Cyrillic: Стари град Вратник 'old town Vratnik'), is a local community within the Stari Grad municipality and is one of the oldest neighbourhoods in Sarajevo, Bosnia and Herzegovina.

== History ==
Developed by the Ottomans since 16th century, its core was redeveloped into in the fortified "walled city" in 18th century, after Prince Eugene of Savoy brief terror-raid into Ottoman-held Bosnia which culminated in sacking and burning of undefended open city of Sarajevo.

The Walled city of Vratnik represents urban core within the wider neighbourhood of Vratnik and is designated as a national monument of Bosnia and Herzegovina since 2005.

Vratnik is of Slavic origin and is derived from the form Bratnik, which appears in the Turkish documents in the second half of the 15th century. Others believe, Vratnik name comes from the word "vrata" (gateway or door). The old Vratnik fort is associated with its location alongside the roads by which persons and goods entered the town from east at that time. The "Imperial Road" (Carska Džada), road from Sarajevo via Višegrad to Istanbul, led over Vratnik for centuries.

Up until the brief but devastating terror-raid of Prince Eugene of Savoy in 1697, when the city was sacked and numerous buildings burnt and rest of it severely damaged, Sarajevo was an open city. The event prompted governor Ahmed-paša Rustempašić Skopljak in 1727, to order Vratnik town and most of its core to be redeveloped into the fortified "walled city". Vratnik is a tourist attraction primarily due to its old town architecture and Sarajevo city view lookouts.

Inside Vratnik walls lies an old town

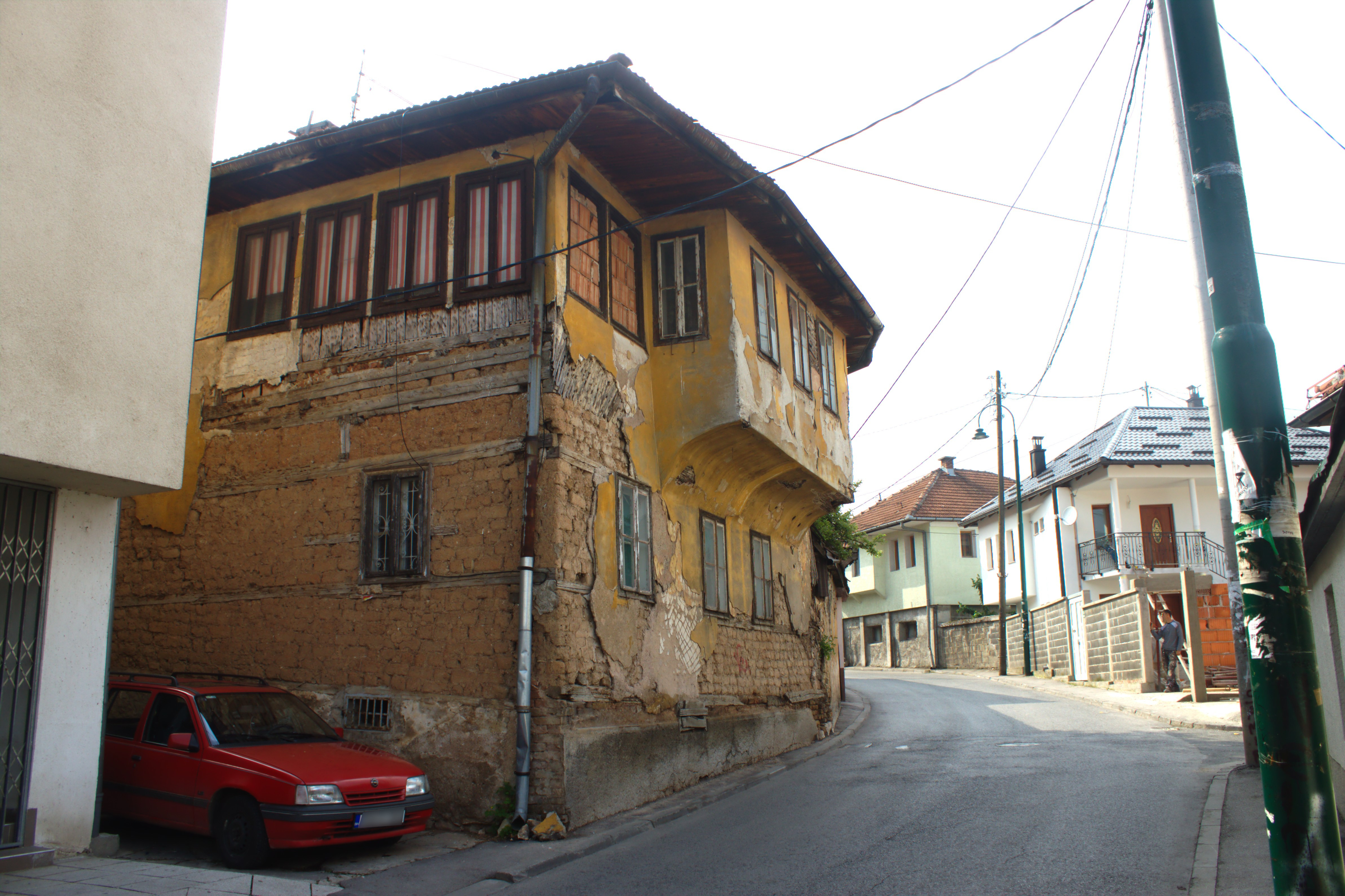
Old house of Bosnian architecture

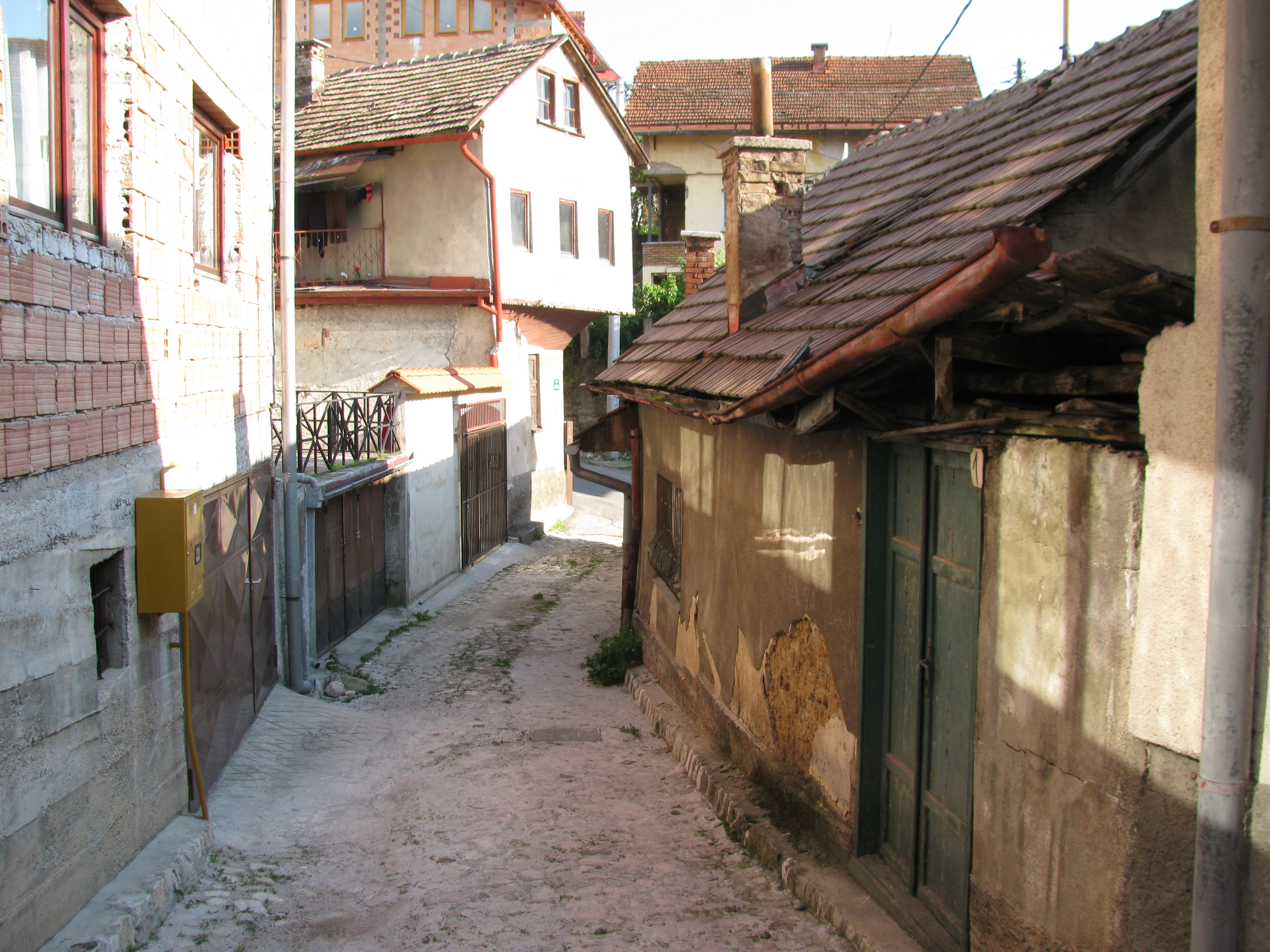
Tight street spaces

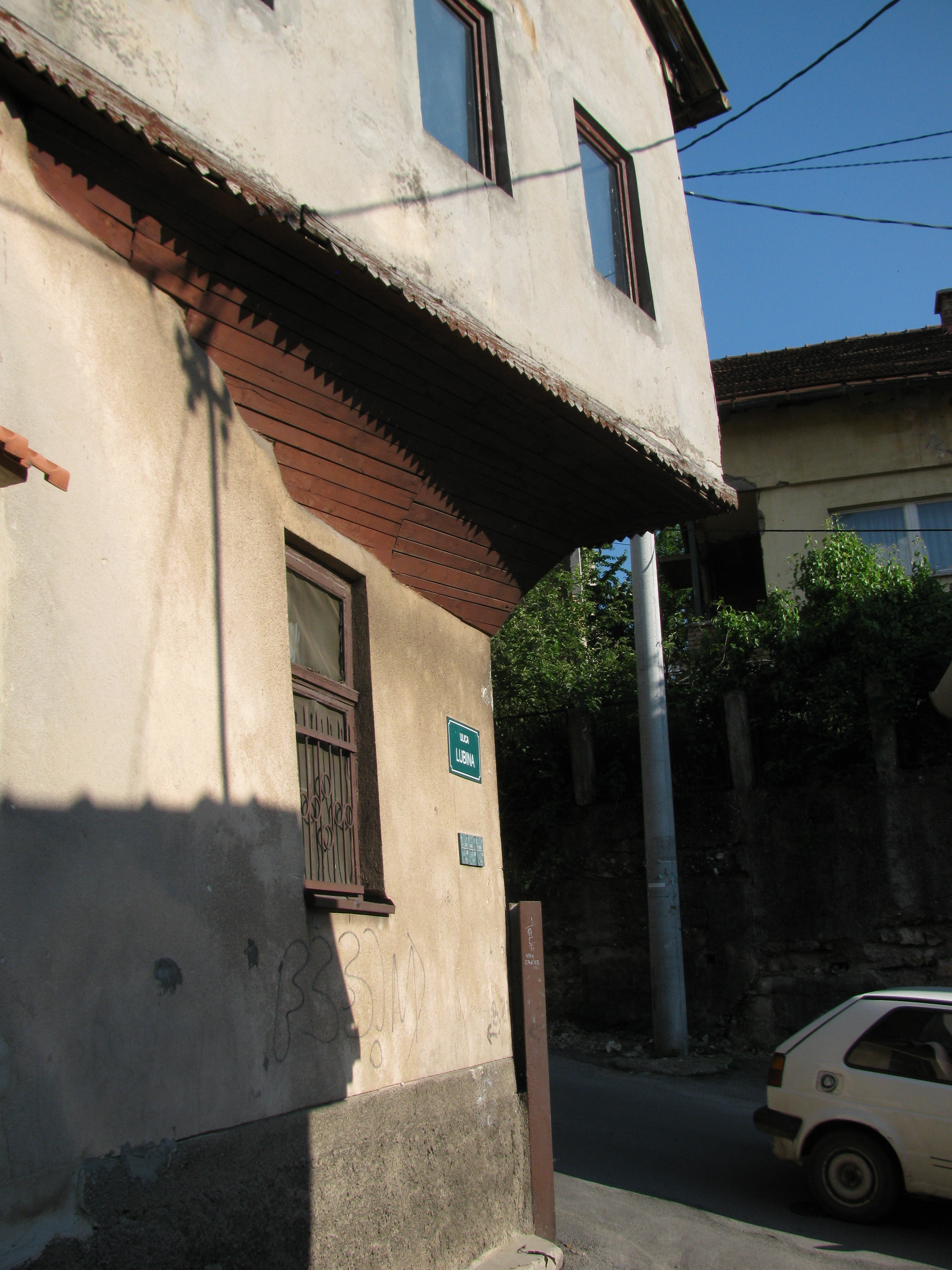
Old Vratnik town architecture

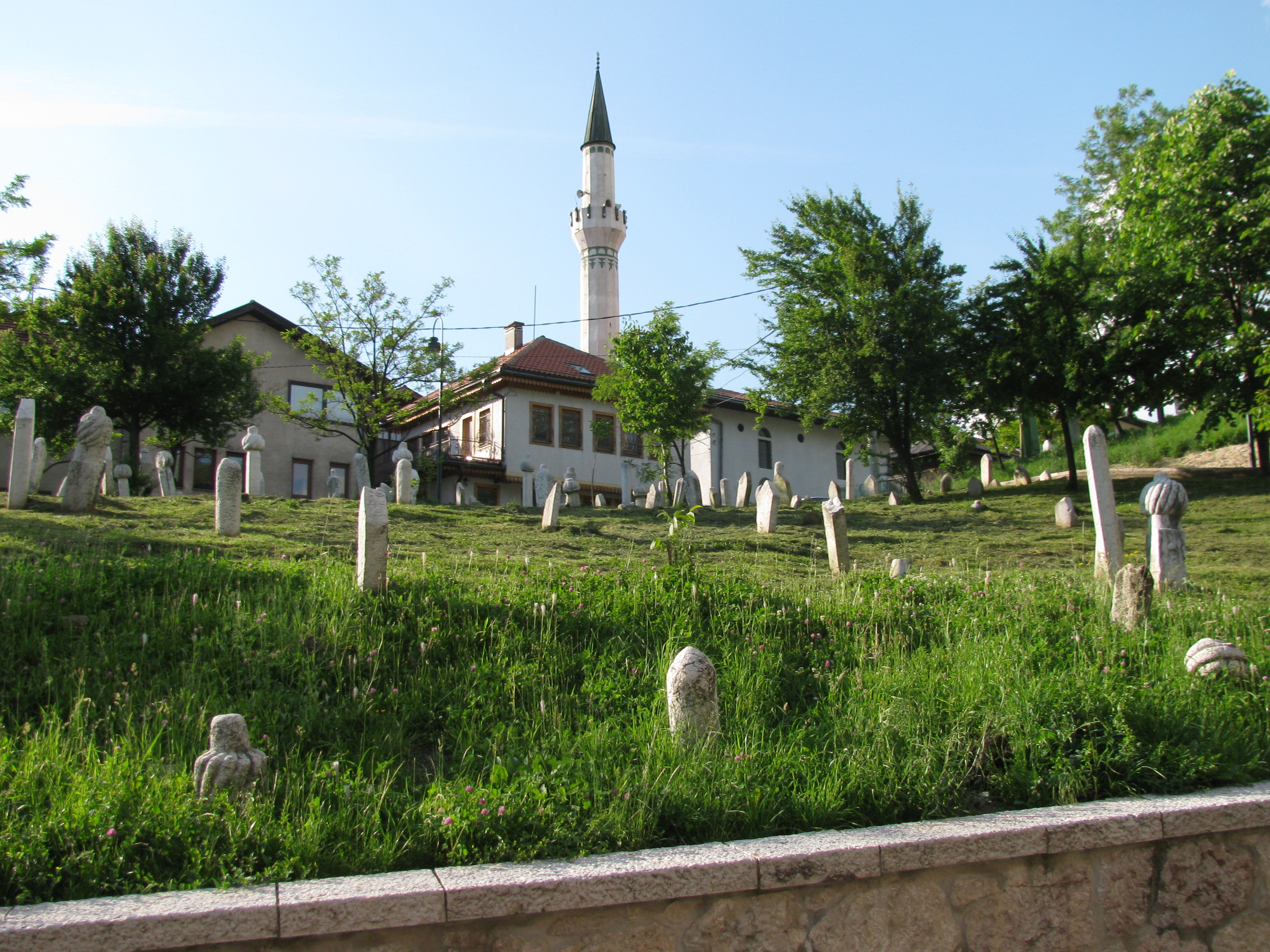
Mišćina mosque (2010)

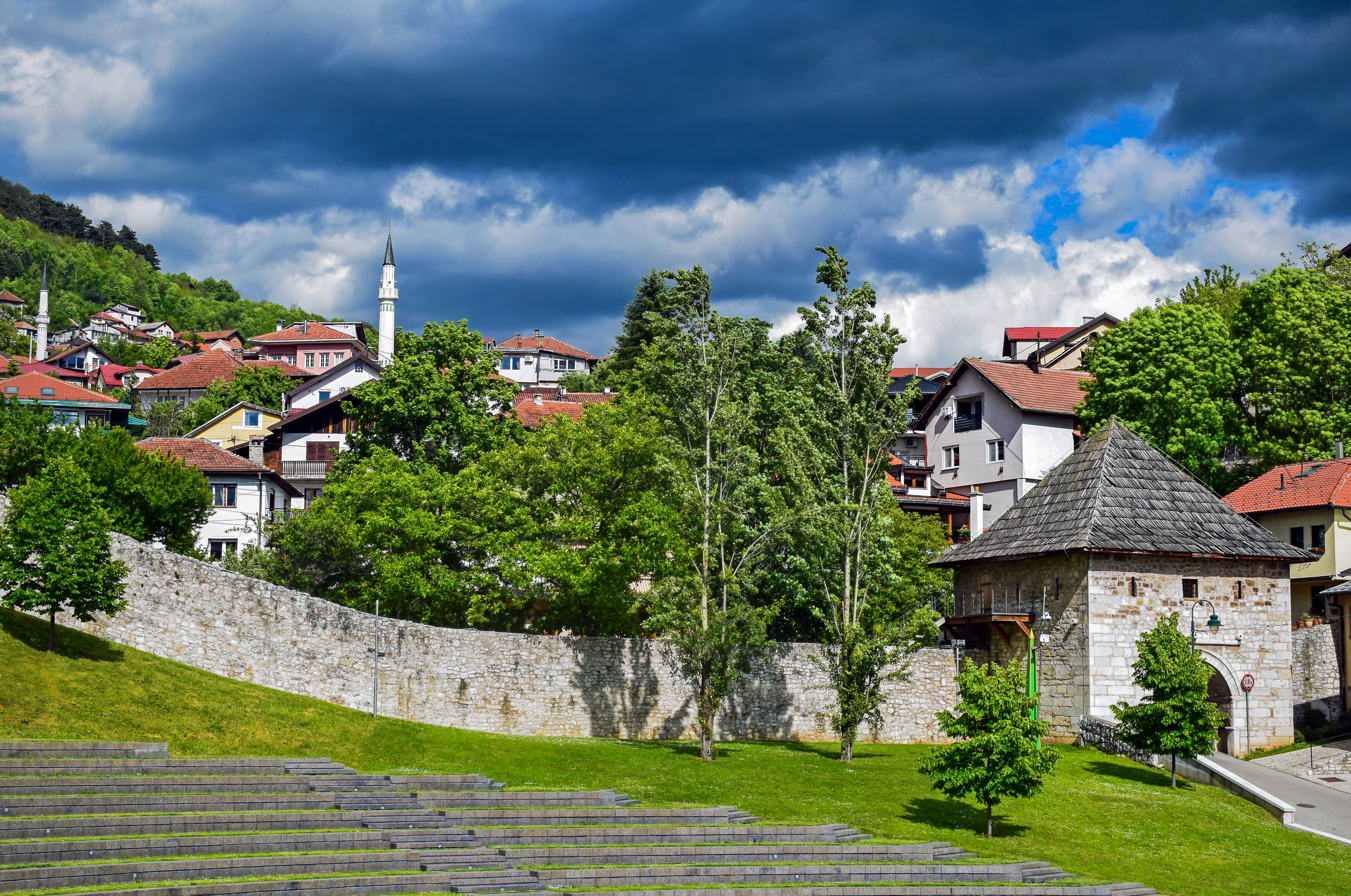
Fortification walls and Širokac Tower (2025)

== Heritage ==
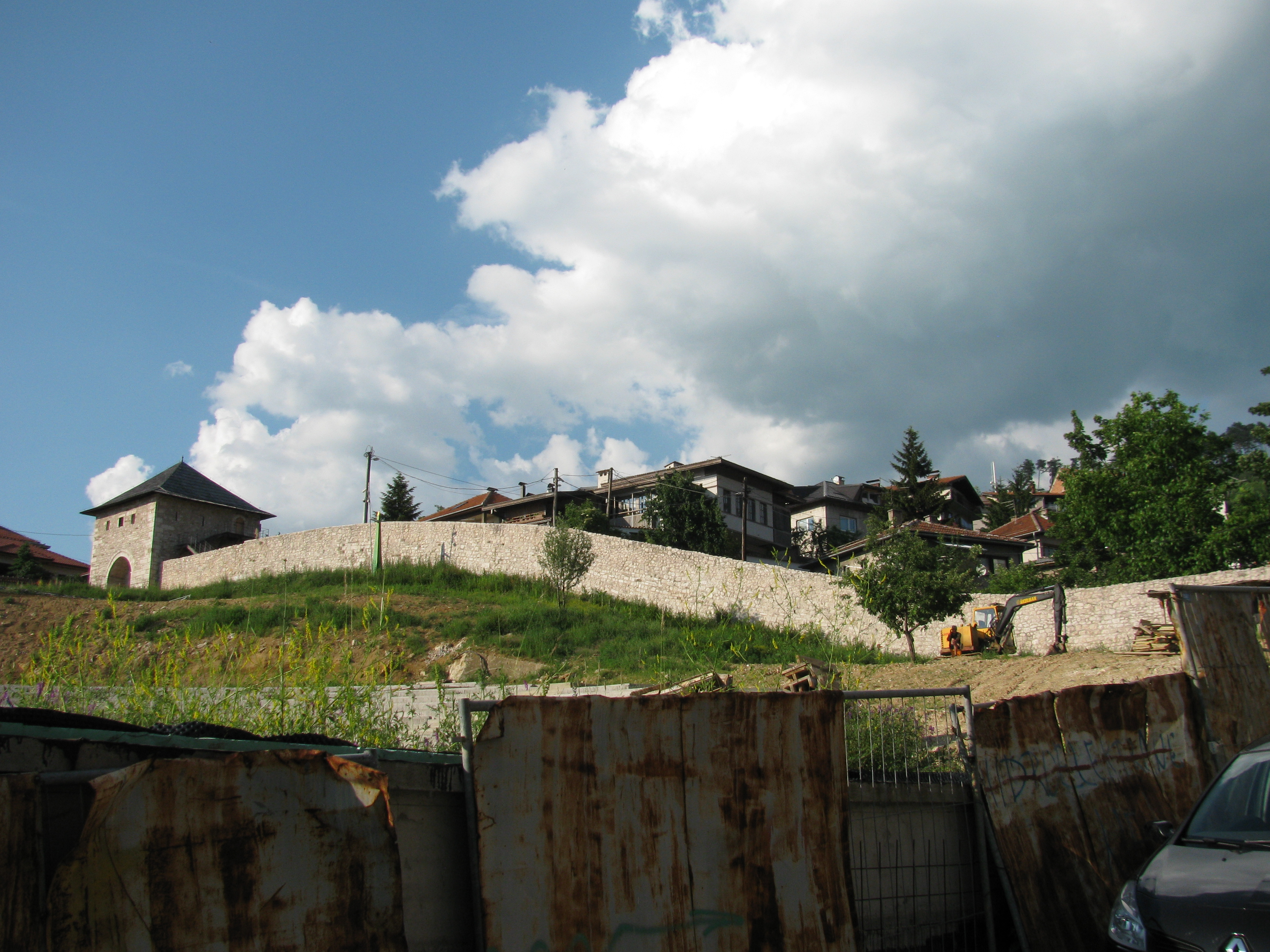
Vratnik perimeter walls

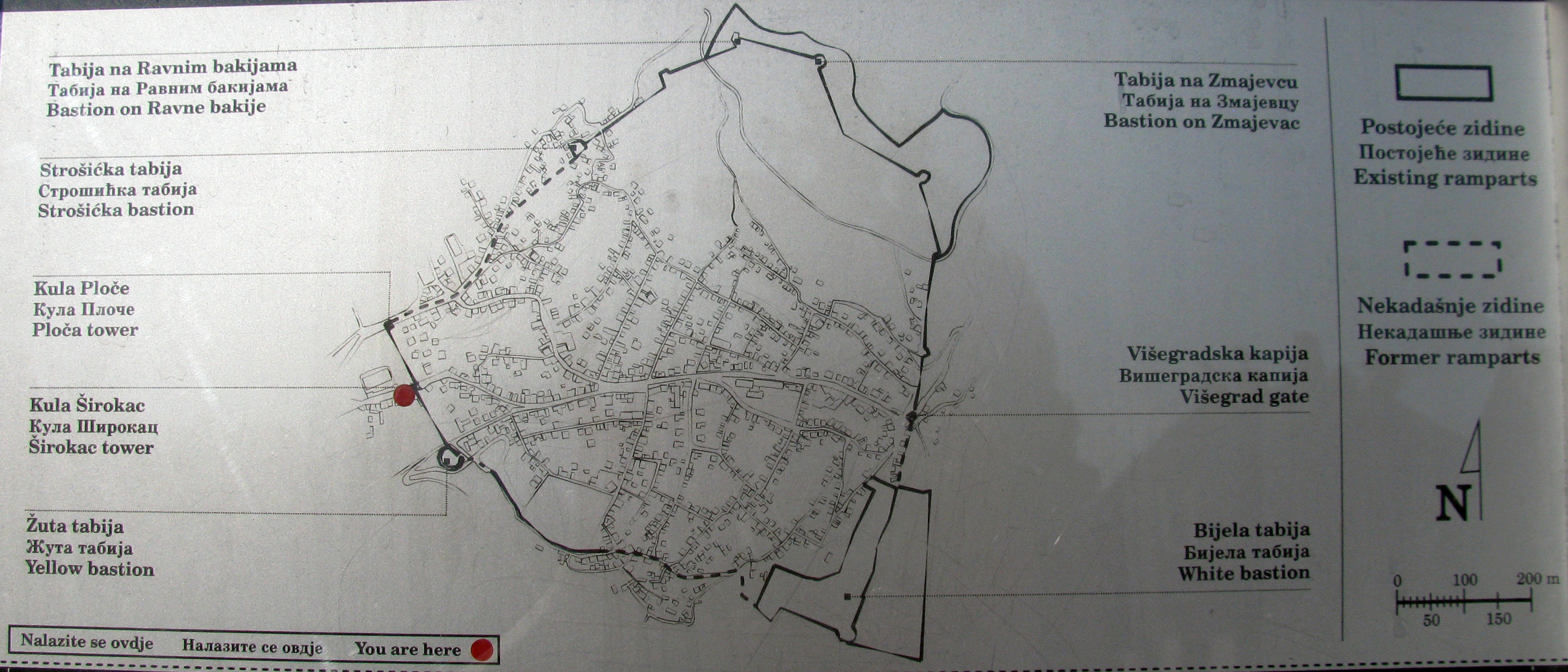
Map of the "Walled city of Vratnik".

The Walled city of Vratnik represents urban core within the wider neighbourhood of Vratnik. Since 2005 the KONS designated walled area of the neighborhood a national monument of Bosnia and Herzegovina.

It includes features such as Visegrad Gate as the main entry point to a town and is one of the three city gates (towers) in the Vratnik Old Town (The old Vratnik fort) with the other two being Širokac Gate and Ploča Gate. It was built between 1727 and 1739, in limestone and a special Bosnian stone "hreša" with roof shingles. Traffic went east via the main road towards Visegrad (thus the name) and continued further to the east towards Istanbul.

Ploča Gate is transformed into the Alija Izetbegović Museum, in commemoration to a former first president of Bosnia and Herzegovina, Alija Izetbegović, and opened on 19 October 2007.

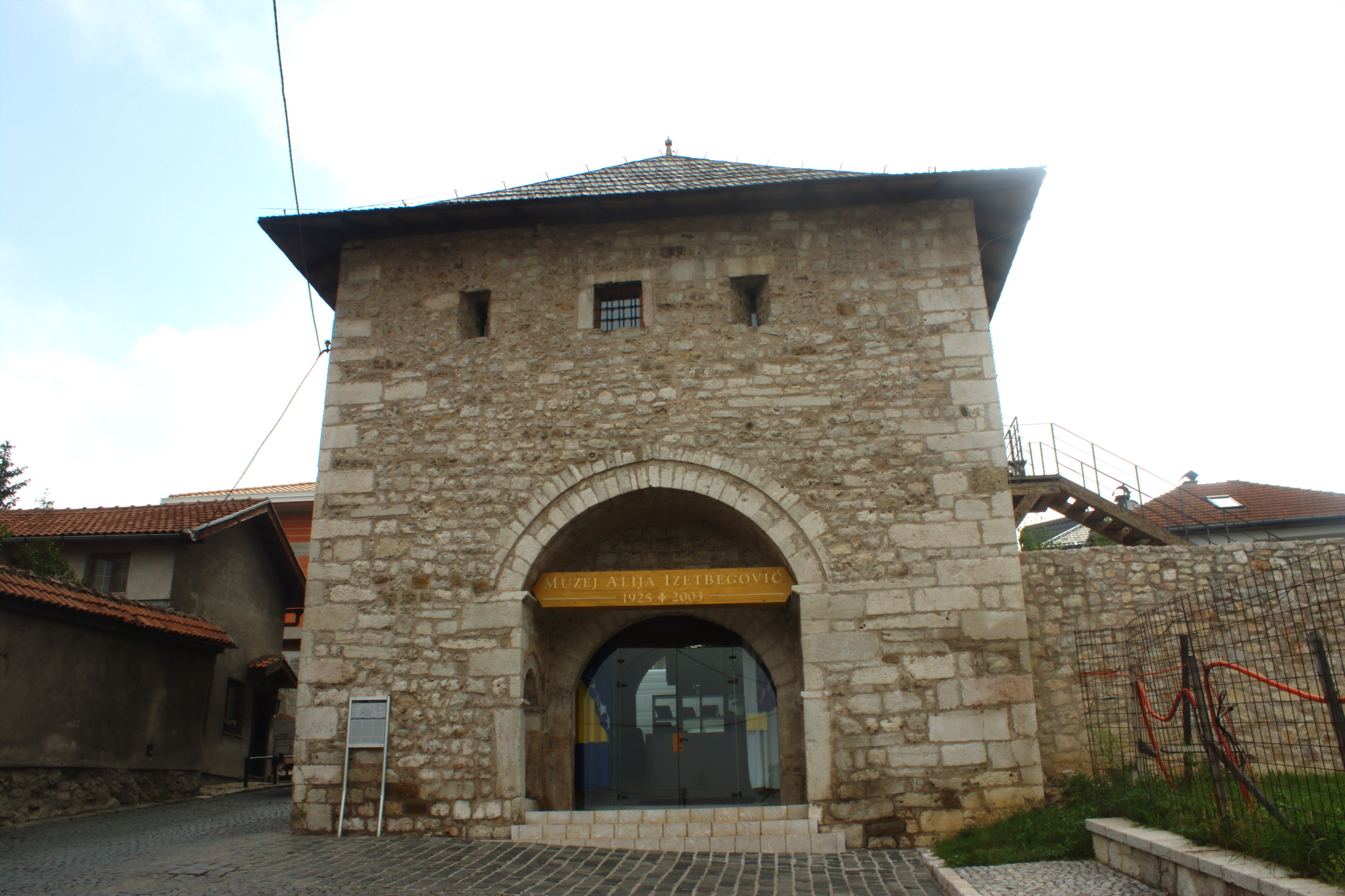
Ploca Tower, now Museum Alija Izetbegović

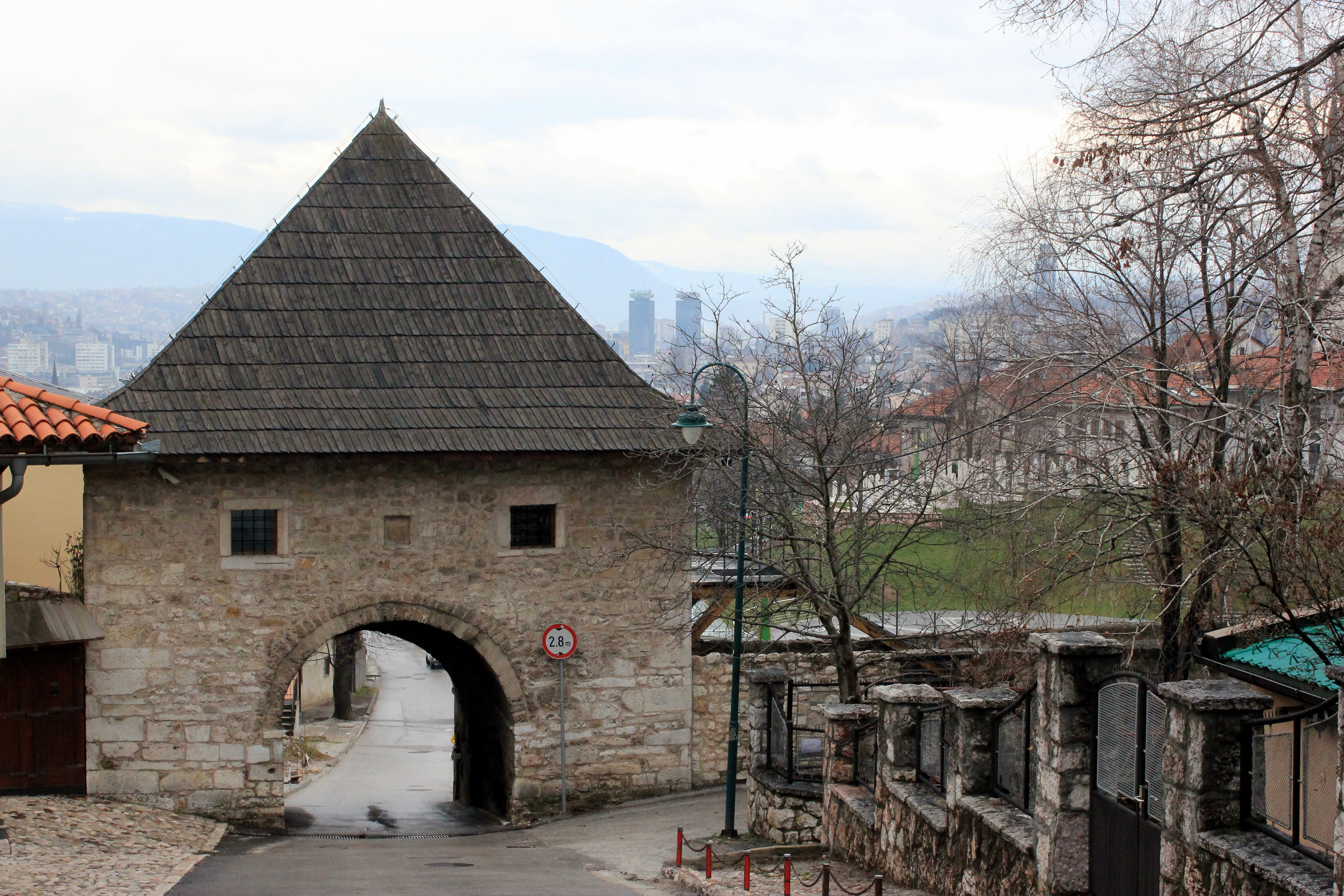
Širokac tower-gate

Along the perimeter walls thera are several forts, such as Bijela Tabija (transl. White Fortress), Žuta Tabija (transl. Yellow Bastion and smaller bastions. Bijela Tabija is a cannon bastion/fortress which also served to accommodate soldiers. It is assumed to have been built at the site of a small medieval town "Hodidjed" (central fortress of the Vrhbosna Parish). The fortress overlooks Sarajevo with the panoramic views of the eastern entrance to Sarajevo, the Miljacka River canyon and the city itself.

Žuta Tabija is a cannon fort at Jekovac part of the neighborhood, close to the Jajce Barracks and the Jekovac water reservoir. It served as one of the defense points against the Austro-Hungarian troops in 1878.

Other important forts are Strošićka Tabija (transl. Strošićki Bastion), Tabija na Ravnim Bakijama (transl. Bastion on Ravne Bakije), Tabija na Zmajevcu (transl. Bastion on Zmajevac).

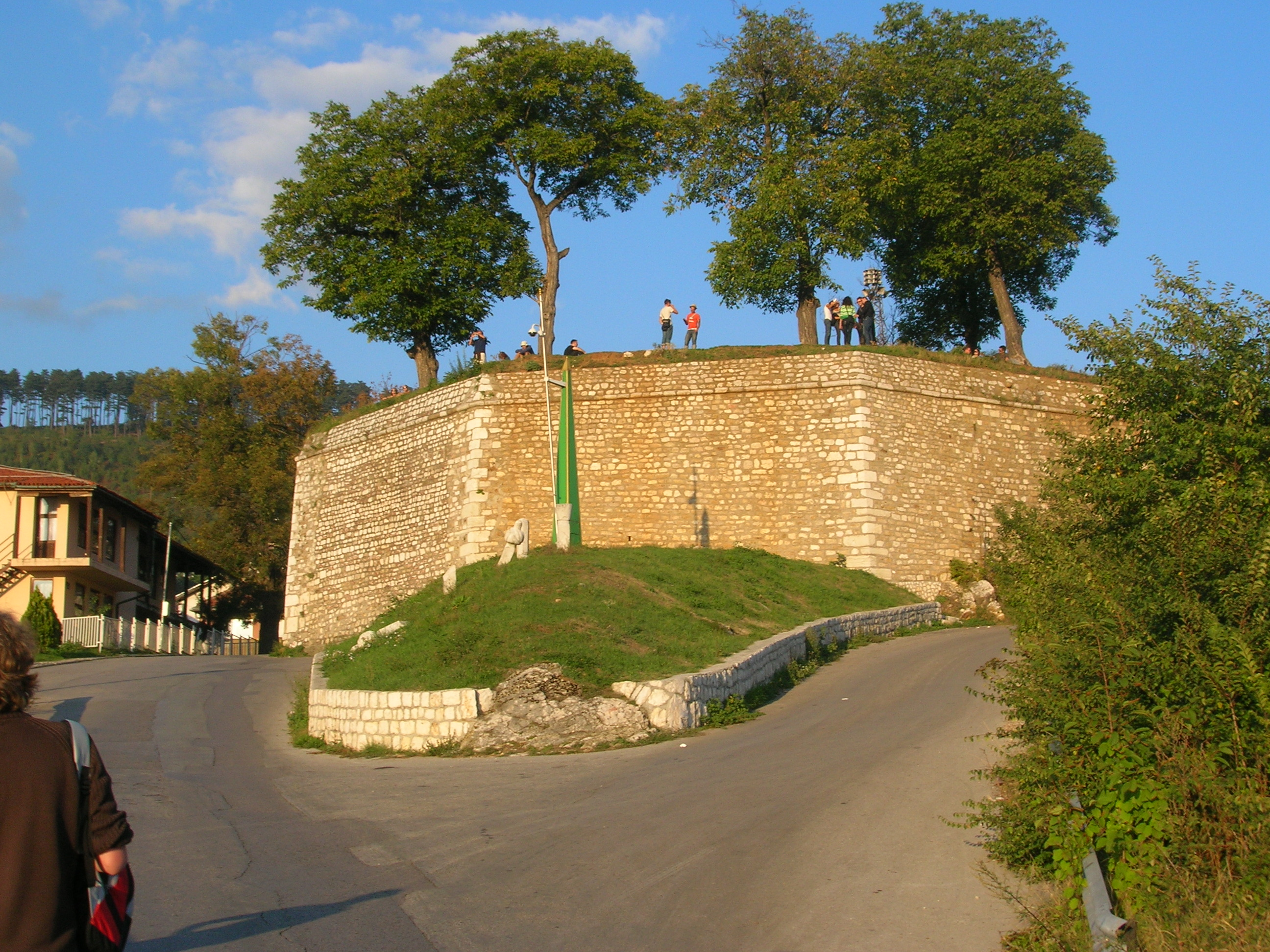
Žuta Tabija

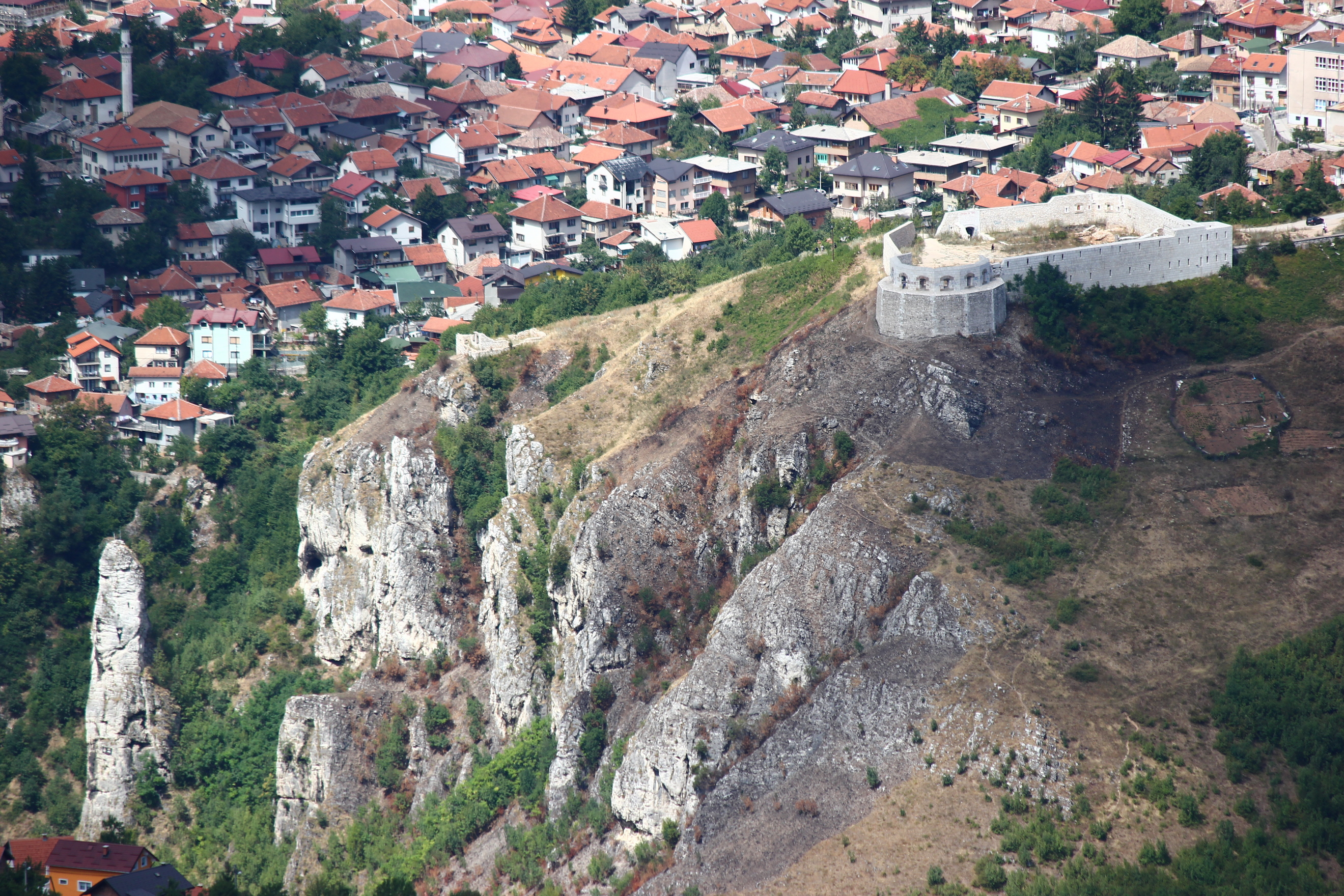
Bijela Tabija from Mt. Trebević

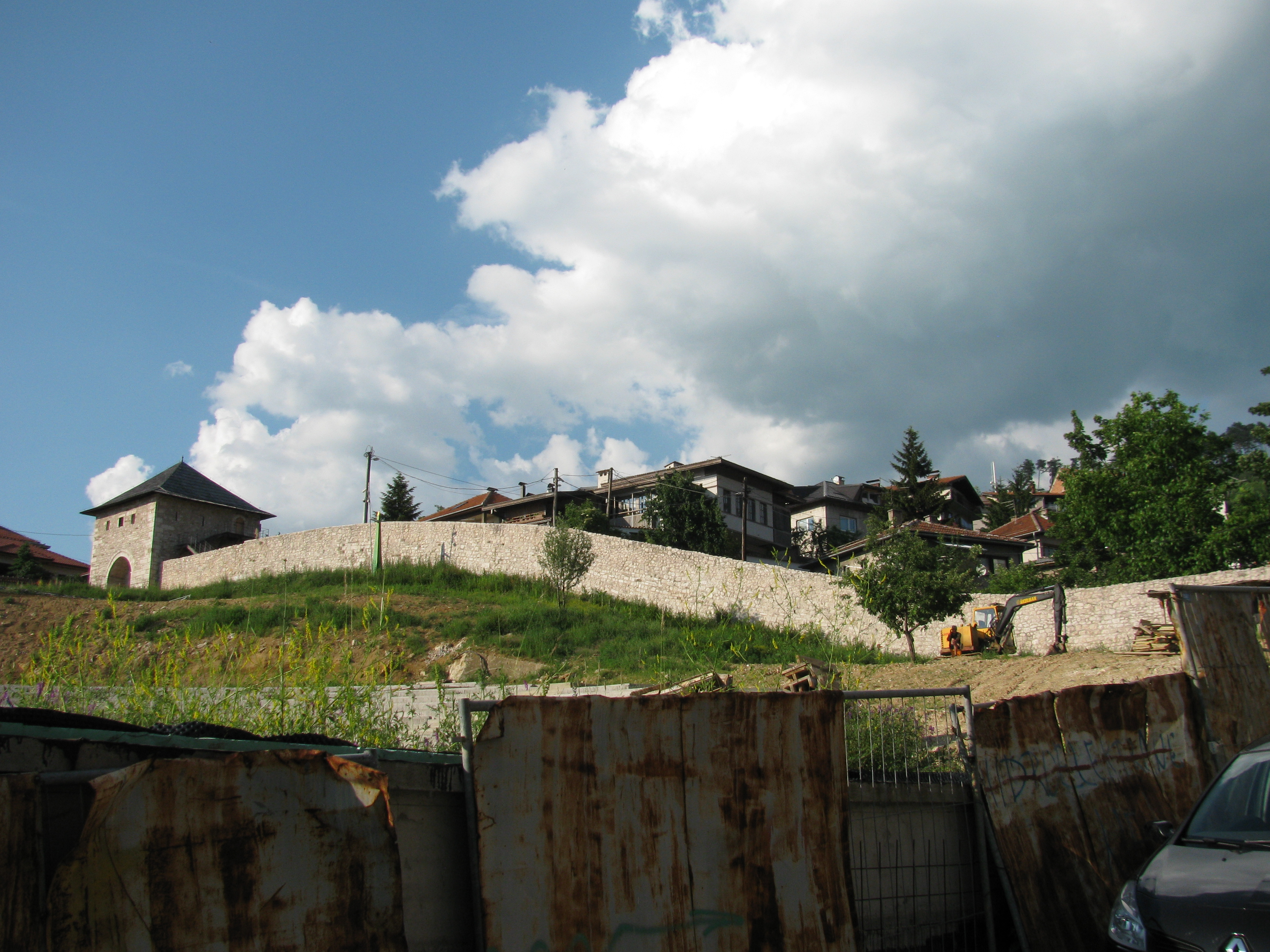
Vratnik walls

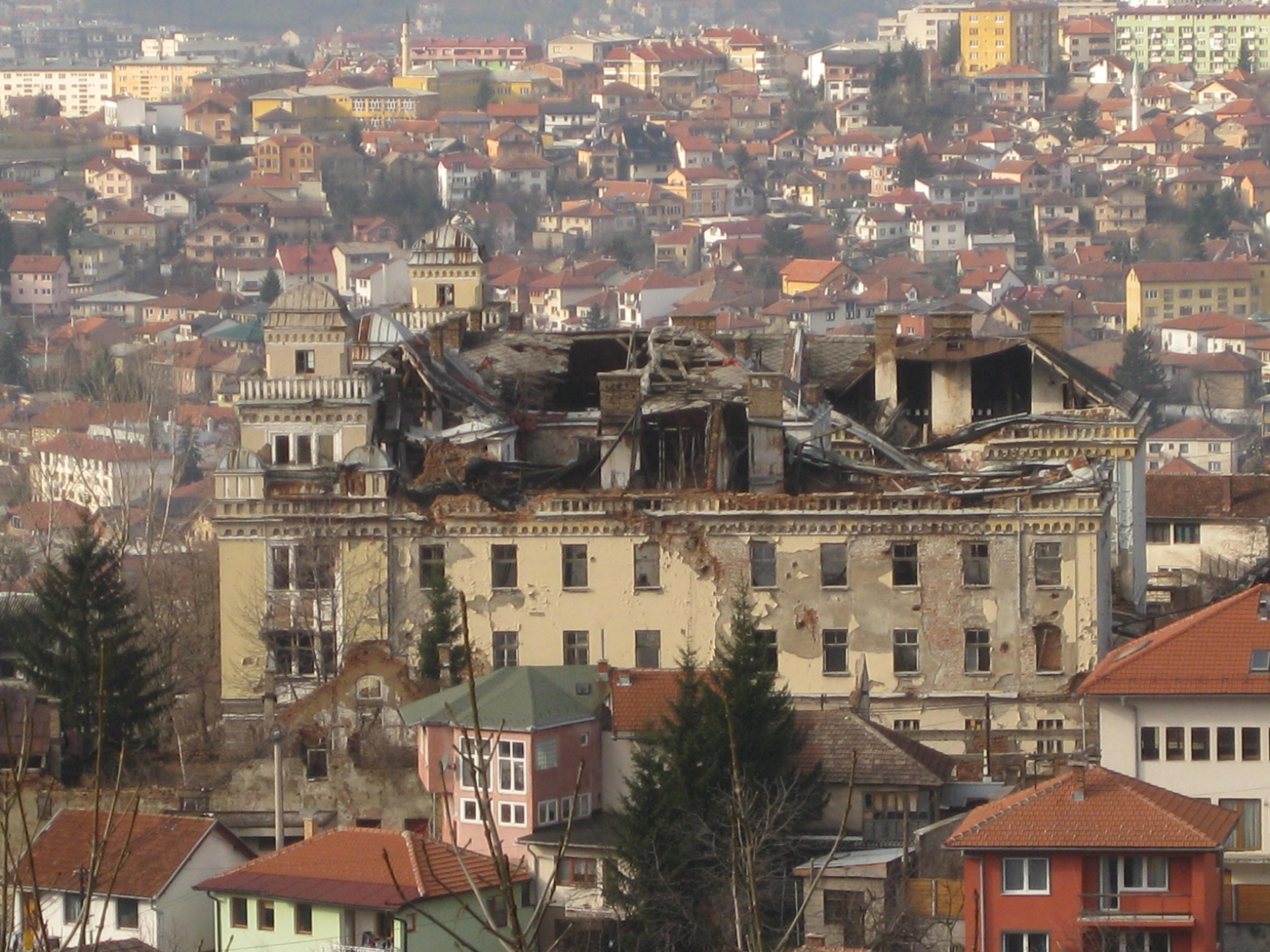

== Other features ==
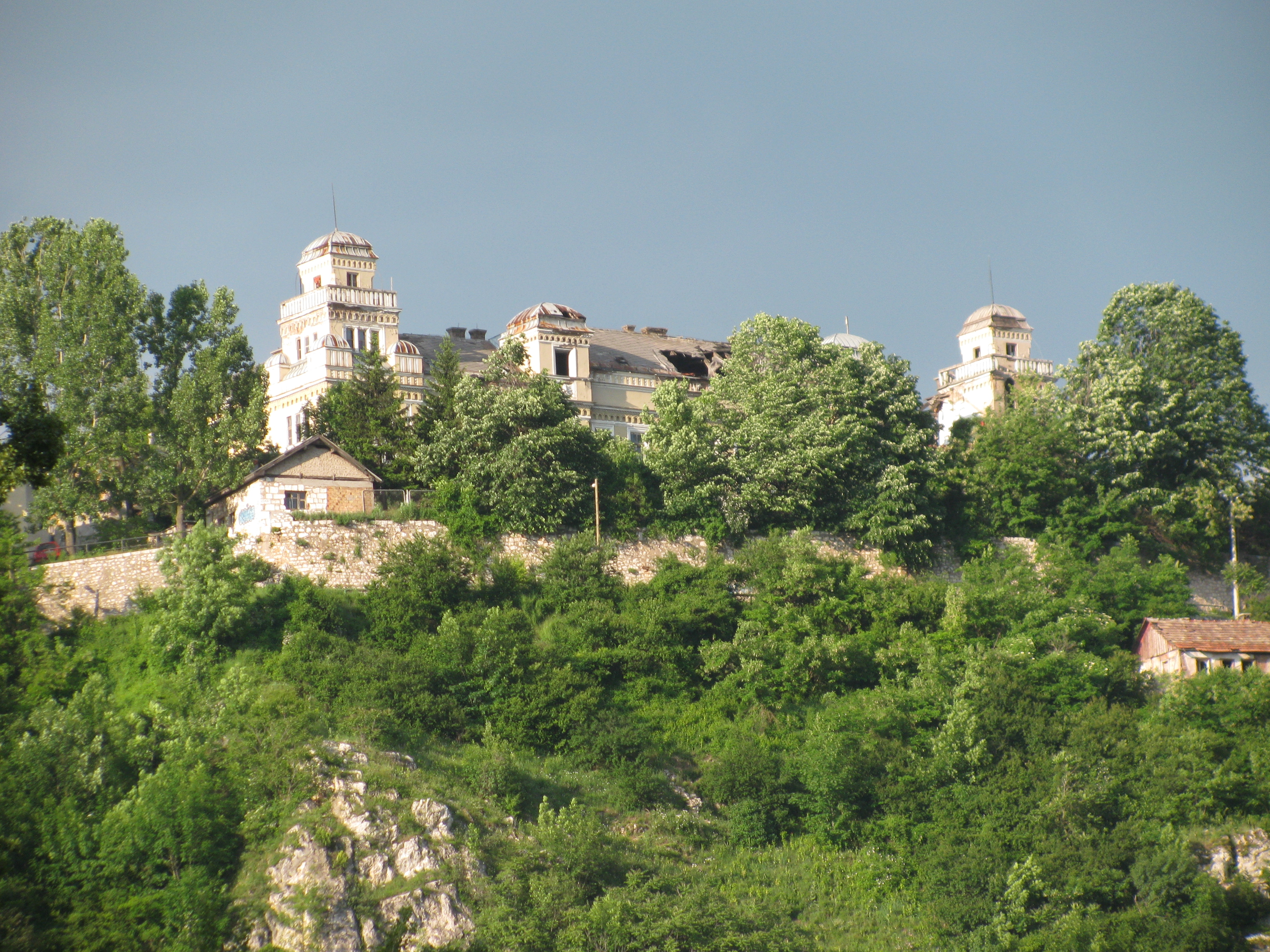
Jajce barracks

Jajce barracks is the name of the former Eugene of Savoy barracks in Sarajevo. Barracks were built in 1914 for the need of the Austro-Hungarian army, and name "Jajce Barracks" carries from 1915 when one Austro-Hungarian military hospital was moved to the Barracks.

== See also ==
- Višnjik
- Skenderija
