= Sonemus Fest =

- Genre: Contemporary classical music
- Dates: April–May
- Locations: Sarajevo, Bosnia and Herzegovina
- Years active: 2001 – present
- Founders: Ališer Sijarić
- Attendance: 8,000 (2024)
- Filing status: Nonprofit
- Website: www.sonemus.com

Sonemus Fest is an international multi-day contemporary classical music festival which annually takes place in Sarajevo, Bosnia and Herzegovina. It was established in 2001 by The Society Of New Music Sarajevo (SONEMUS) in cooperation with the Sarajevo Music Academy and the Pro Helvetia Foundation. Its focus is on the promotion of classical composers from the countries of Southeast Europe who belong to the contemporary art music aesthetic. The festival has hosted numerous international composers such as Jürg Wyttenbach, Urška Pompe, Uroš Rojko, Marko Nikodijević, Richard Barrett, Antoine Fachard, Simon Steen-Andersen, Hanan Hadžajlić, Ališer Sijarić, Dino Residbegovic, and others.

== Format ==
The festival is held in April or May of each year and lasts for three days. It is made up of three main programmes that are realised through evening-long concerts held sequentially across the three days. Furthermore, the festival organizes numerous workshops, lectures, panel discussions and exhibitions held in the Ars Aevi museum of contemporary art.

== Venues ==
- Sarajevo Music Academy
- Bosnian Cultural Center
- Dom armije
