= Dino Rešidbegović =

Bosnian music composer

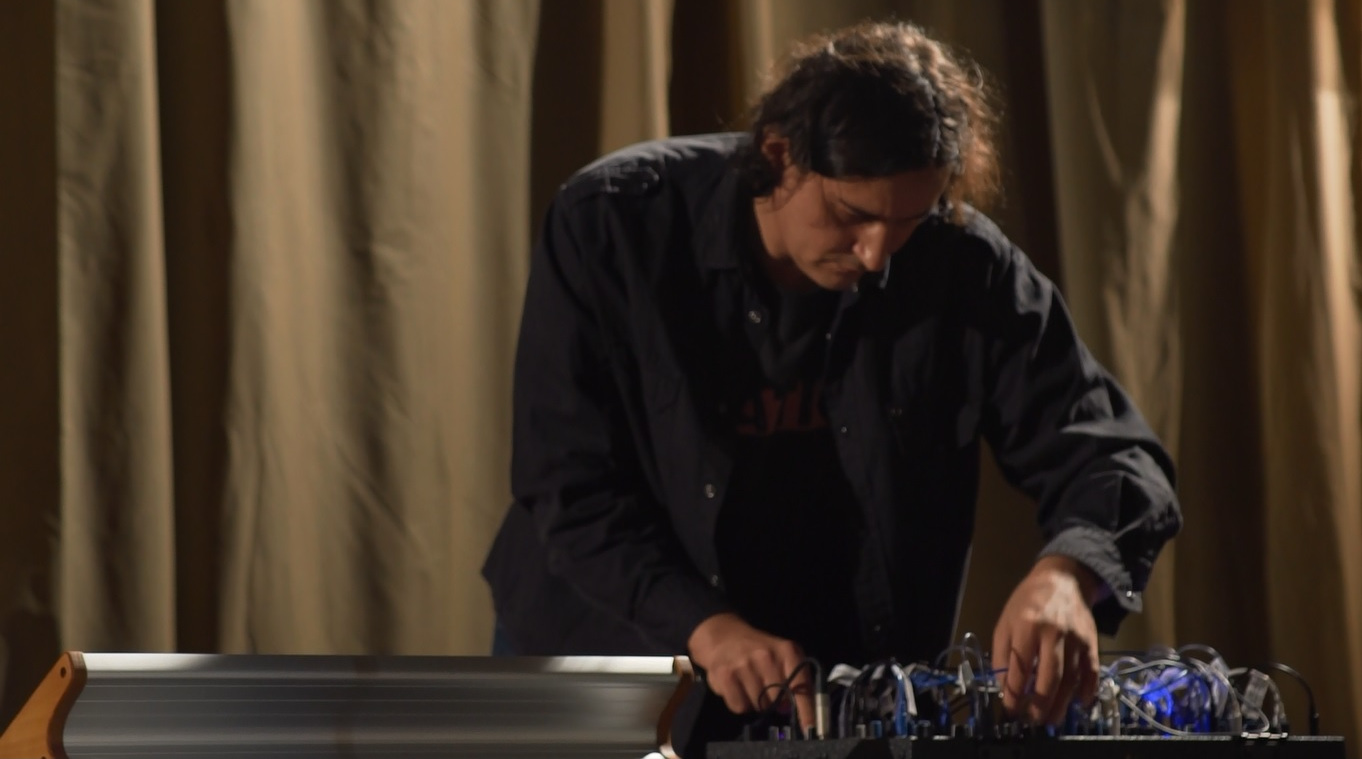
- Rešidbegović performing XO in Sarajevo
- Born: December 14, 1975 (age 50); Sarajevo, SR Bosnia and Herzegovina, SFR Yugoslavia
- Education: MDW; MUK; Sarajevo Music Academy
- Occupations: Composer; pianist; teacher

Dino Rešidbegović (born 14 December 1975) is a Bosnian contemporary classical and electroacoustic music composer, pianist, and academic. He studied composition and piano at the University of Music and Performing Arts Vienna and the Music and Arts University of the City of Vienna, and earned a DMA in composition from the Sarajevo Music Academy in 2016.

His works have been performed in Europe, Japan, and the United States, including at Carnegie Hall, by ensembles such as the Sarajevo Philharmonic Orchestra and Ensemble Proton Bern. The third movement of his Piano Concerto No. 1 was used in the documentary film Cameraperson (2016), directed by Kirsten Johnson. He is a member of the Austrian Composers Society and co-founded the INSAM Institute for Contemporary Artistic Music. He is a professor at the Sarajevo Music Academy, where he teaches composition, electronic music, and polyphony.

== Early life and education ==
Born and raised in Sarajevo, Rešidbegović received his initial training in piano at local music schools. In 1994 he moved to Vienna, where he pursued advanced studies in composition at the University of Music and Performing Arts and the Music and Arts University. He graduated from the University of Music and Performing Arts, studying composition under HK Gruber, Wolfgang Liebhart and Rainer Bischof, and piano under Kim Oak Hyun.

He continued with postgraduate studies in composition at the same institution, focusing on contemporary techniques, and also undertook training in conducting. In 2016 he earned a DMA in composition at the Sarajevo Music Academy, where he studied with Igor Karača from Oklahoma State University and then-dean Ivan Čavlović.

== Career ==
=== Collaborations and performances ===
Rešidbegović's music has been performed by groups such as the Sarajevo Philharmonic Orchestra, Ensemble Proton Bern, and the Austrian Art Ensemble. His works have been performed in Bosnia and Herzegovina, Croatia, Slovenia, Serbia, Germany, Switzerland, Austria, Italy, Japan, and the United States, including a performance at Carnegie Hall.

He has collaborated with musicians including Omer Blentić, Hanan Hadžajlić, Davor Maraus, Gilles Grimaître, Katharina Bleier, and Elena Gabrielli. His orchestral compositions have been conducted by Samra Gulamović, Josip Nalis, and Obrad Nedeljković. The Austrian conductor Azis Sadikovic has repeatedly included Rešidbegović’s cycle Three Orchestral Miniatures in his concert repertoire.

The third movement of Rešidbegović’s Piano Concerto No. 1 was used in the feature documentary Cameraperson, directed by Kirsten Johnson.

=== Academic activities ===
Rešidbegović is a permanent member of the Austrian Composers Society (ÖKB), and co-founded the INSAM Institute for Contemporary Artistic Music, where he remains active as a writer, researcher, and organiser of international projects.

Rešidbegović is also a full-time professor at the Department of Composition and Electronic Music at Sarajevo Music Academy, teaching courses in composition, electronic/electroacoustic music, and polyphony.

== Musical style and influences ==
=== Reductional Music Complexity (RMC) ===
In 2003, Rešidbegović introduced the concept of Reductional music complexity, a compositional approach that categorizes and reorders musical parameters. His music is often described as “rhythmical,” reflecting his focus on rhythm as the core element, or “corpus,” of musical expression.

Influenced by composers such as John Cage, Mauricio Kagel, Karlheinz Stockhausen, Hans-Joachim Hespos, Rainer Bischof, and Detlev Müller-Siemens, Rešidbegović moved away from pitch-centered composition to emphasize rhythm, dynamics, extended instrumental techniques, and individual expression marks. Much of his work employs graphic notation to convey these ideas.

=== Piano extended techniques ===
His work incorporates extended piano techniques involving the instrument's strings and resonator, alongside electronic sound production and synthesizers within contemporary classical contexts.

=== Approximate Reductionist Graphical Notation (ARGN) ===
In his doctoral dissertation Subtractive Synthesis in Composition Rešidbegović introduced Approximate Reductionist Graphical Notation (ARGN), a notational system designed to represent electronic and acoustic sound structures graphically.

== Honours and awards ==
Rešidbegović has received the following awards:

- Alban Berg Foundation – 2001
- Alban Berg Foundation – 2002
- Theodor Körner Prize – 2003
- Siemens AG Österreich Award – 2004
- Siemens AG Österreich Award – 2005
- Avdo Smailović AMUS Award – 2018/19

== Selective works ==
=== Experimental, aleatoric, and music theatre ===
- XO – any instrument. A conceptual piece that allows the performer complete freedom in choosing instruments and interpretation.
- Chelovek for bass and computer-generated sound. The related piece Recitativo Chelovek is noted as the first music composition to incorporate Google Translate as a musical instrument.
- 3X for two pianists and deconstructed drum set

=== Electronic and electroacoustic music ===
Subtractive Study for Sound Synthesizers and Ensemble
Sample from "Subtractive study for sound synthesizers and ensemble"

- Subtractive Study for Sound Synthesizers and Ensemble for amplified flute, alto saxophone, violin, cello, electric guitar, synthesizers (DSI Prophet 12, DSI Pro 2, Moog Sub 37, Make Noise CV Bus Shared System) and amplified piano
- XO Part II for amplified flute, amplified cello and analog modular synthesizers (Moog Sub 37, Make Noise CV Bus Shared System, Analog Rytm)
- Wreesky III for solo flute with electronic processors (Boss VE-20, MF-108M Cluster Flux)
- Visiting Speech Therapist, a cycle of four études for amplified piano: Pedal Étude, Percussion Étude, Tapping Étude and Vocal Étude

=== Chamber music ===
- For Sonemus for flute, clarinet, violin and piano
- Mechanicus (Heron from Alexandria) for flute, violin and piano
- The Impact of the Analog Synthesizer for mezzo-soprano, flute, cello, accordion and piano
- RN for flute, clarinet and French horn

=== Vocal music ===
- The Wilderness, a cycle of three songs for bass and piano: Underwaterfall, New York Maidens and Fear
- Homo Sapiens, a cycle of three songs for soprano and piano: Flee for Your Lives, Ethnic Cleansing and Refugees

=== Big band ===
- Mad Haus for big band orchestra.

=== Orchestral music ===
"Bak study for piano and orchestra"
Sample from "Bak study for piano and orchestra"

- Piano Concerto No. 1 for piano and orchestra
- Bak for amplified piano and orchestra.
