= Trg Oslobođenja - Alija Izetbegović =

Square and park in Sarajevo

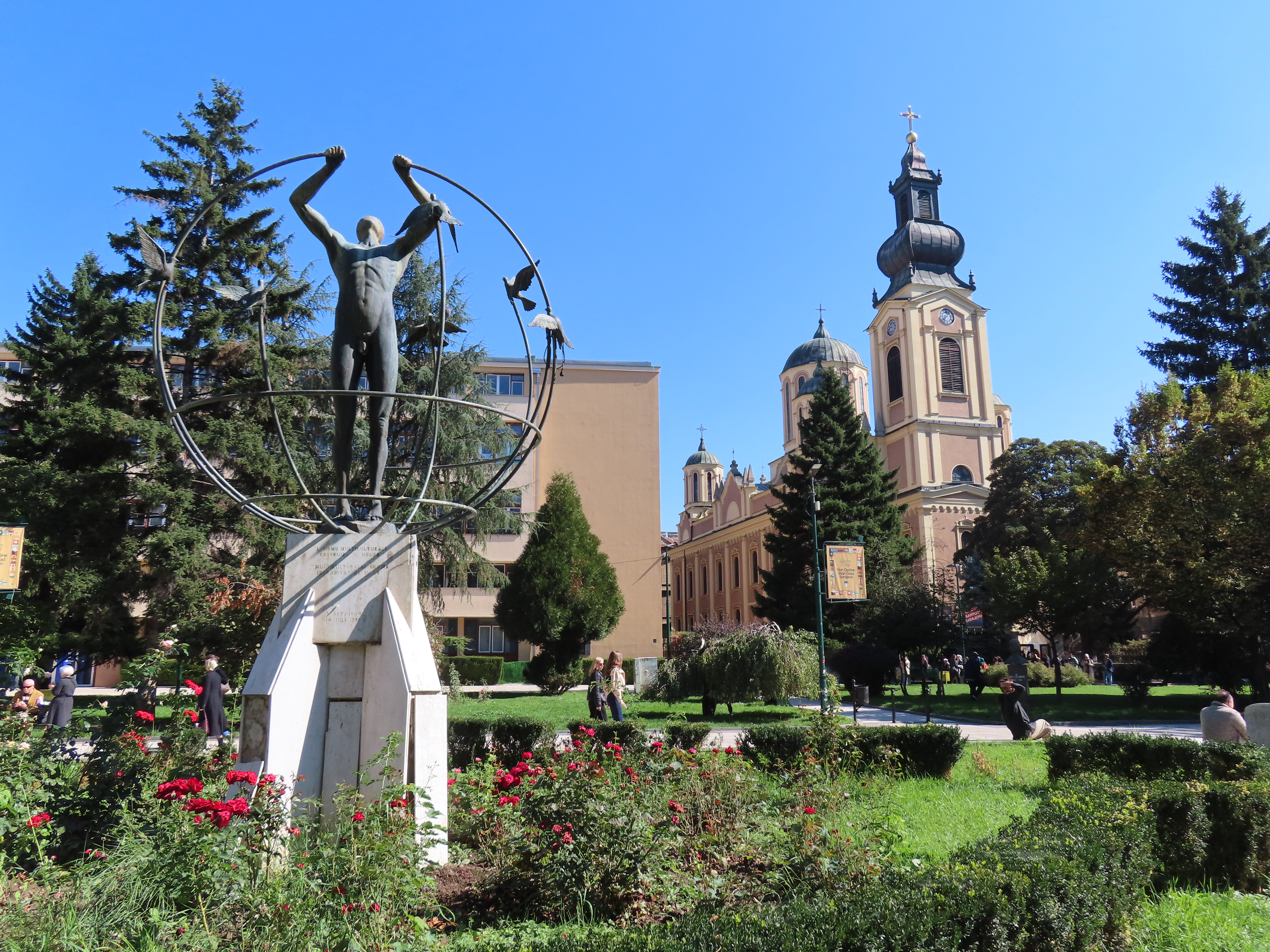
- Interactive map of Trg Oslobođenja - Alija Izetbegović
- Part of: Stari Grad, Sarajevo
- Namesake: Alija Izetbegović
- Coordinates: 43.858414°N 18.424147°E
- North: Ferhadija street
- East: University of Sarajevo School of Economics and Business, Orthodox Cathedral
- South: Zelenih Beretki street, Dom Armije
- West: Svjetlost building

Other
- Known for: Statue of the Multicultural Man (1997); Busts of the Bosnian-Herzegovinian writers; Monument to the Stari Grad 1st Police Brigade

Trg oslobođenja - Alija Izetbegović is a square in Sarajevo, Bosnia and Herzegovina. It lies between the municipalities Stari Grad and Centar. It links the main pedestrian thoroughfare of the Sarajevo old town, Ferhadija street, with Zelenih Beretki street, with the Dom Armije (1881). On its east side it hosts the Orthodox Cathedral (1874) and the University of Sarajevo School of Economics and Business (formerly the Faculty of Orthodox Theology). On its west is the Svjetlost building, while at its south, beyond Zelenih Beretki, stands the Dom Armije (1881)

== History ==
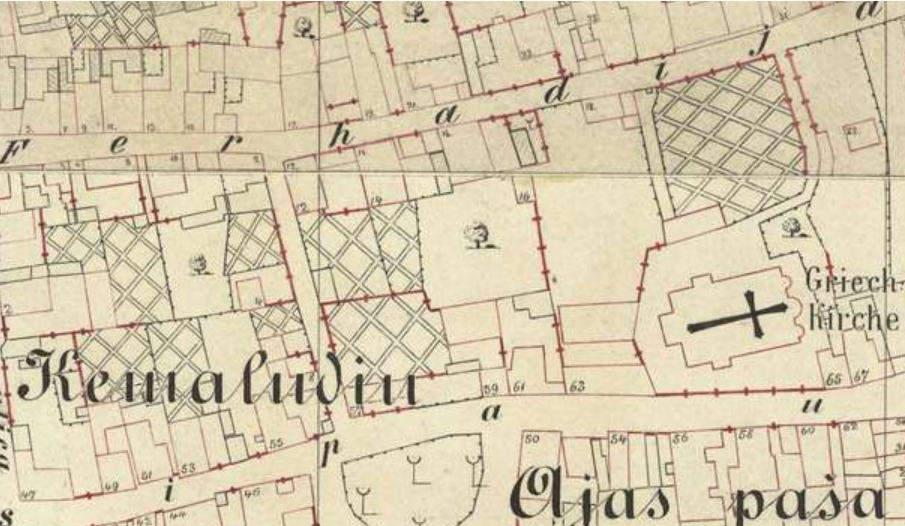
The area of Trg Oslobođenja in 1882

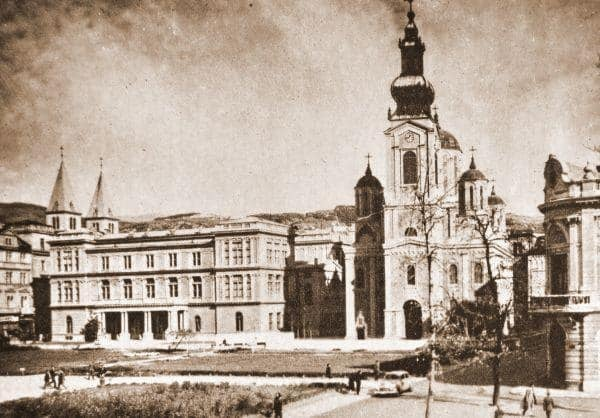
Trg oslobođenja in the 1930s with grass

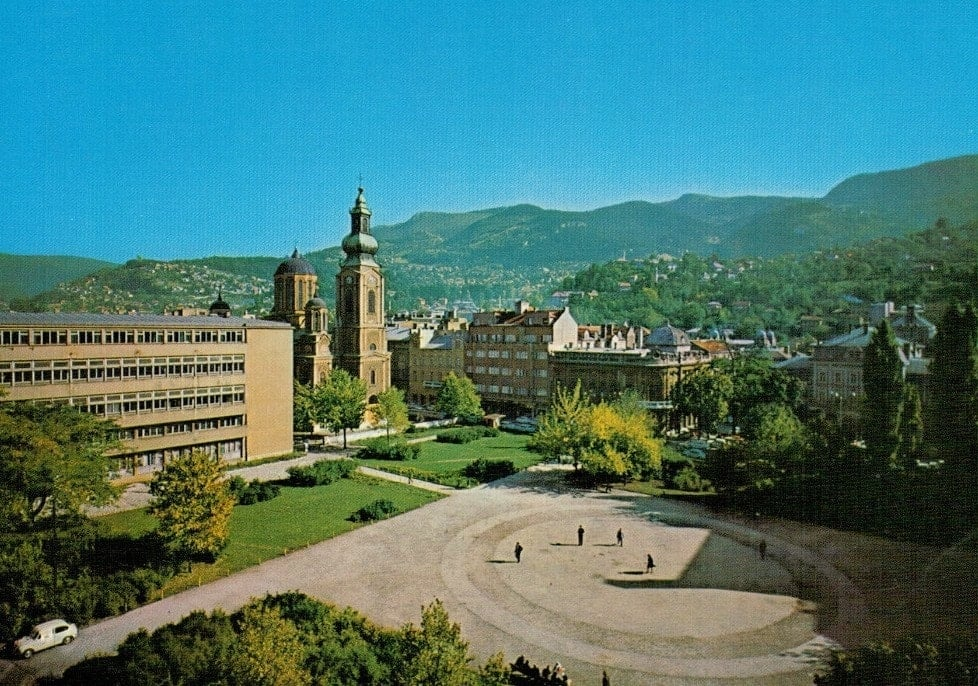
Trg oslobođenja in the 1960s

The square was opened in the interwar period on the site of the former tram/train station and customs house (gradski kolodvor). In the 1920s, monuments to the first King of Yugoslavia, Peter I of Serbia, were planned in multiple cities across the kingdom. In Sarajevo, while at first planned in dominant position on the hill of Hrid, the square in front of the Dom Armije was finally chosen for the monument and renamed after King Petar in 1934. Following the demolition of the old train station and customs house, in 1938 a jury including Ivan Meštrović awarded the competition for the monument to the Zagreb sculptor Fran Kršnić. The sections of the equestrian statue were brought to Sarajevo in late 1940 and early 1941. According to some sources, the start of the war thwarted the erection of the monument. However, a photo from the national archives shows the erected statue on its pedestal.

During the Second World War and the occupation of Sarajevo by the Independent State of Croatia in 1941–1945, the square was renamed after Stjepan Tomašević. A monument to the fallen German soldiers, with an eagle topping a column, was also erected on the square, in front of the Orthodox Cathedral; it was demolished in 1945.

In the socialist period, the square starts to take the shape of today, trees included. The former Faculty of Orthodox Theology is rebuilt as Faculty of Economics, while a new building on the west side of the square hosts the Svjetlost (Light) publishing house (1973). A socialist monument is erected at its centre in 1977, coupled in the early 1980s with a series of busts representing Bosnian-Herzegovinian writers: Veselin Masleša, Ivo Andrić, Rodoljub Čolaković, Branko Ćopić, Mak Dizdar, Skender Kulenović, Meša Selimović, and Isak Samokovlija. The busts were withdrawn from the square during the Siege, and will only be reinstated in 2001, save for the one of Masleša.

The square survived the 1992–1995 war (its trees were not cut even during the siege). A sculpture, which was a gift from the Italian artist Francesco Perilli ("The multicultural man will build the world"), was erected at its centre in 1997 and soon became one of the landmark sights of Sarajevo.

In 2005 the square was partially renamed by adding to the traditional Trg oslobođenja denomination the name of the first President of the independent Republic of Bosnia and Herzegovina, Alija Izetbegović. Another smaller memorial to the fallen soldiers of the First Police Brigade of Stari Grad was erected in 2007 close to the Orthodox Cathedral, with the symbol of a Bosnian lily and a police badge. The giant chess in front of the Orthodox cathedral remains one of the daily meeting places for elderly Sarajevans.

Names

- Oficirski trg, Officers' Square
- Trg Klemansa Žorža Benjamina, in 1919 the smaller part of the square in front of the Dom Armije was named after French foreign minister Georges Clemenceau
- Trg Petra I Oslobodioca, Square of Petar I the Liberator, 1934–1941
- Trg Stjepana Tomaševića, Stjepan Tomašević Square, during the NDH occupation in 1941–1945. The smaller square in front of Dom Armije was named after herceg Stjepan Vukčić Kosača
- Trg Slobode, Freedom Square, 1946–1948
- Trg Oslobođenja, Liberation Square, 1948–2005
- Trg oslobođenja – Alija Izetbegović since October 2005

== Projects ==
Since 2000 there has been an initiative to build on the square a monument to all fallen soldiers and citizens of Sarajevo during the siege. The plans included the building of a wall on which all the names of the dead would be written, as well as "appropriately mark the name and work of the first President of BiH Alija Izetbegović". The memorial square would also represent the sedimentation of the history of Sarajevo, integrating the other monuments, including the busts of the writers.

A project for the reconstruction of Trg Oslobodjenja was announced in early 2020 by the mayor of Stari Grad, Sarajevo, Ibrahim Hadžibajrić (NDL), with an underground car park that would be financed by the municipality of Fatih (Istanbul), for a total of 6 million euros. The tender dossier, of December 2019, however, do not mention the parking, but instead include a detailed architectural and cultural report of the historic square and its context.

On January 28, 2021, the Stari Grad municipal council, with Hadžibajrić just re-elected for the fourth term, approved the project: three floors of underground parking, for 242 cars, a mainly paved square, to host fairs and events, and a new monument to the soldiers fallen during the siege of Sarajevo. The busts of Bosnian-Herzegovinian writers should remain, as well as the memorial to the First Police Brigade of the Old Town, while the socialist monument from 1977 is no longer mentioned. The statue of the Multicultural Man should also be relocated in front of the Vijećnica – in another formerly green area, now paved – or in another more peripheral neighborhood like Mojmilo or Dobrinja. Most trees, older than 50 years, would also be cut down.

The Bosnian Association of Landscape Architects has spoken out against the project, emphasizing how it would bring further traffic and pollution to the historic center and its pedestrian area.

A number of procedural shortcomings, including lack of public consultation, also cast doubt on its legality. On February 26, the Commission to Preserve National Monuments of Bosnia and Herzegovina (KONS) ordered the suspension of all activities until it is confirmed that the project complies with planning regulations, including the designation of Sarajevo's historic urban landscape as a national monument of Bosnia and Herzegovina, from January 2020.

== Galleries ==
The square across history

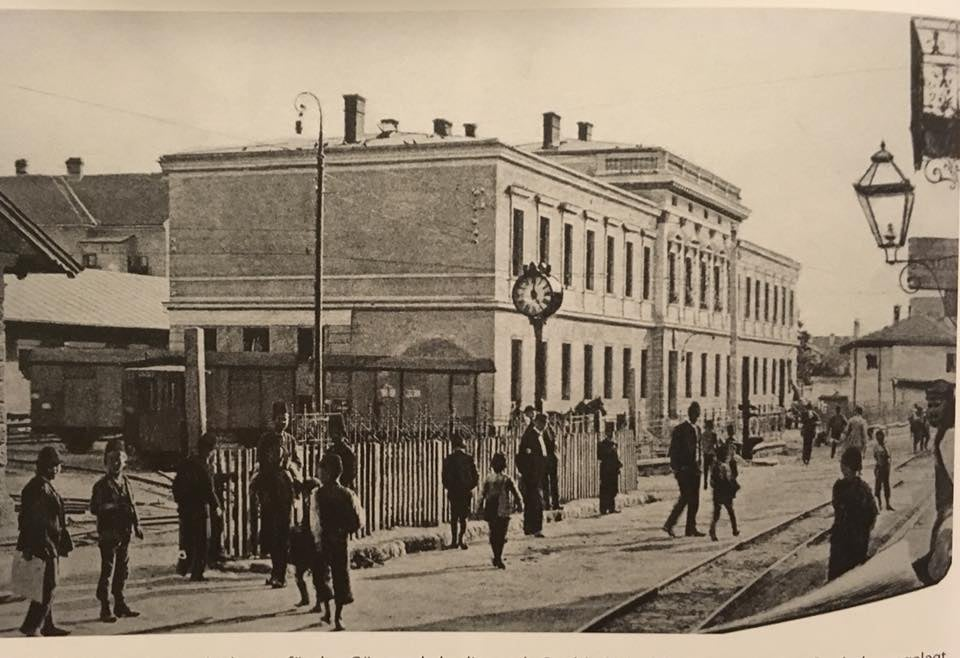
Ferhadija, Gradski kolodvor

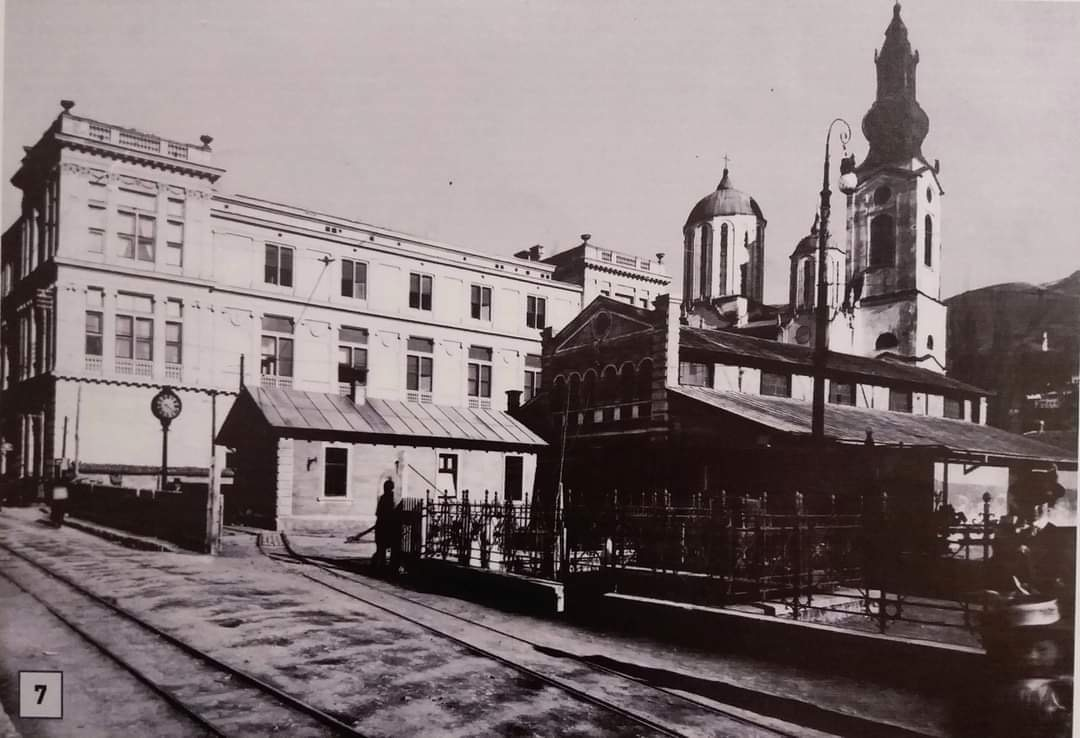
Ferhadija, Gradski kolodvor

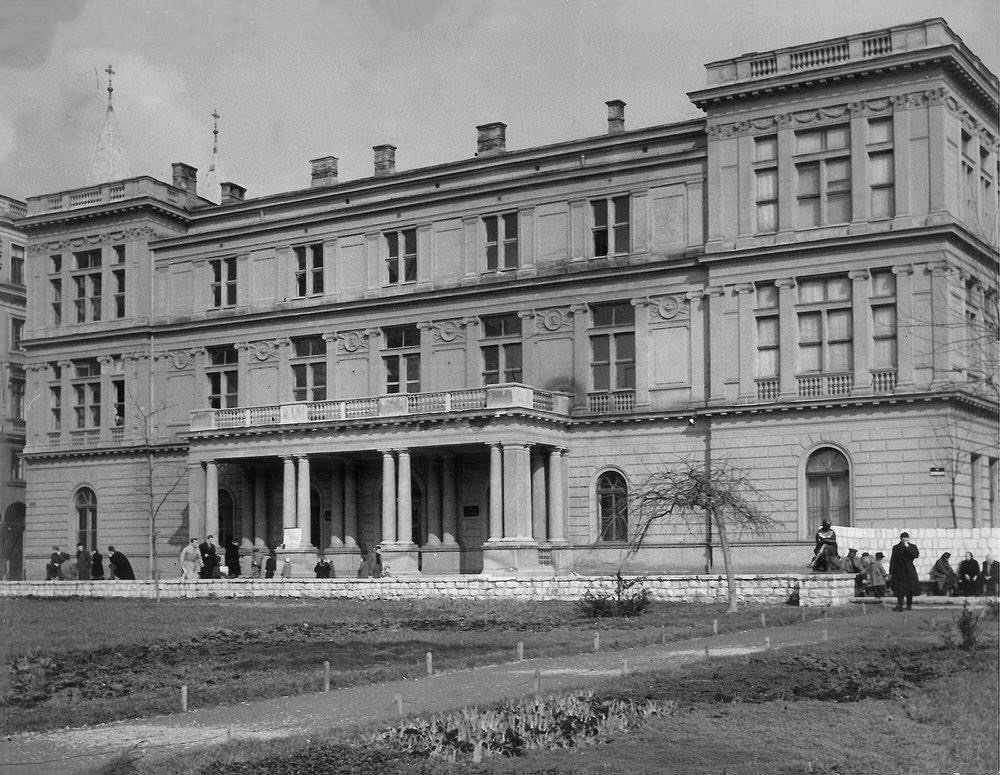
Serbian primary school, ca. 1900

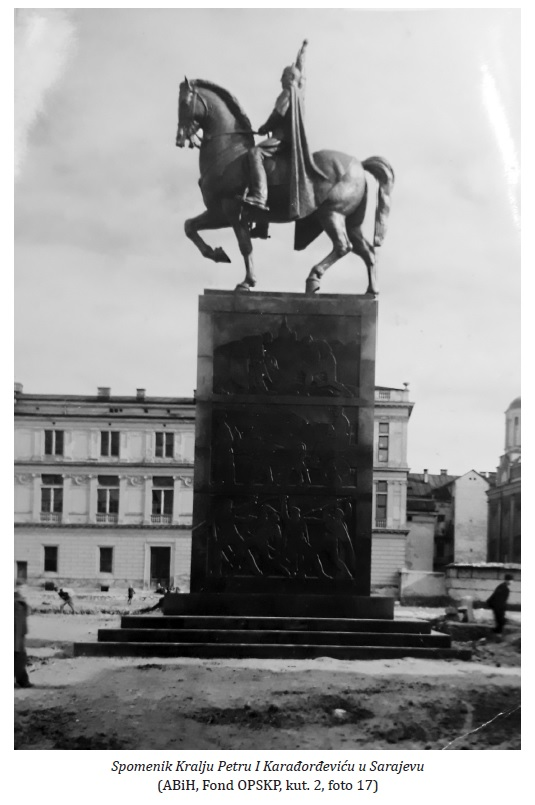
Monument to King Petar Karađorđević, 1920s–1930s

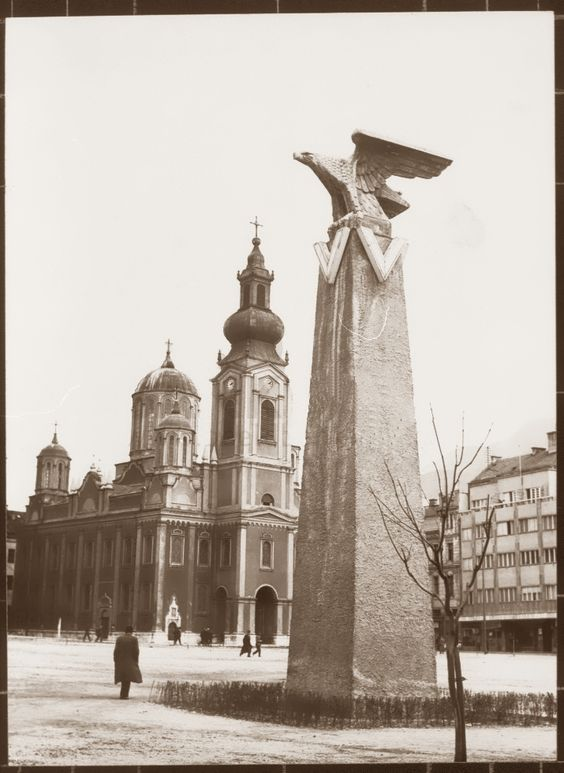
Monument to German fallen soldiers, 1941–1945

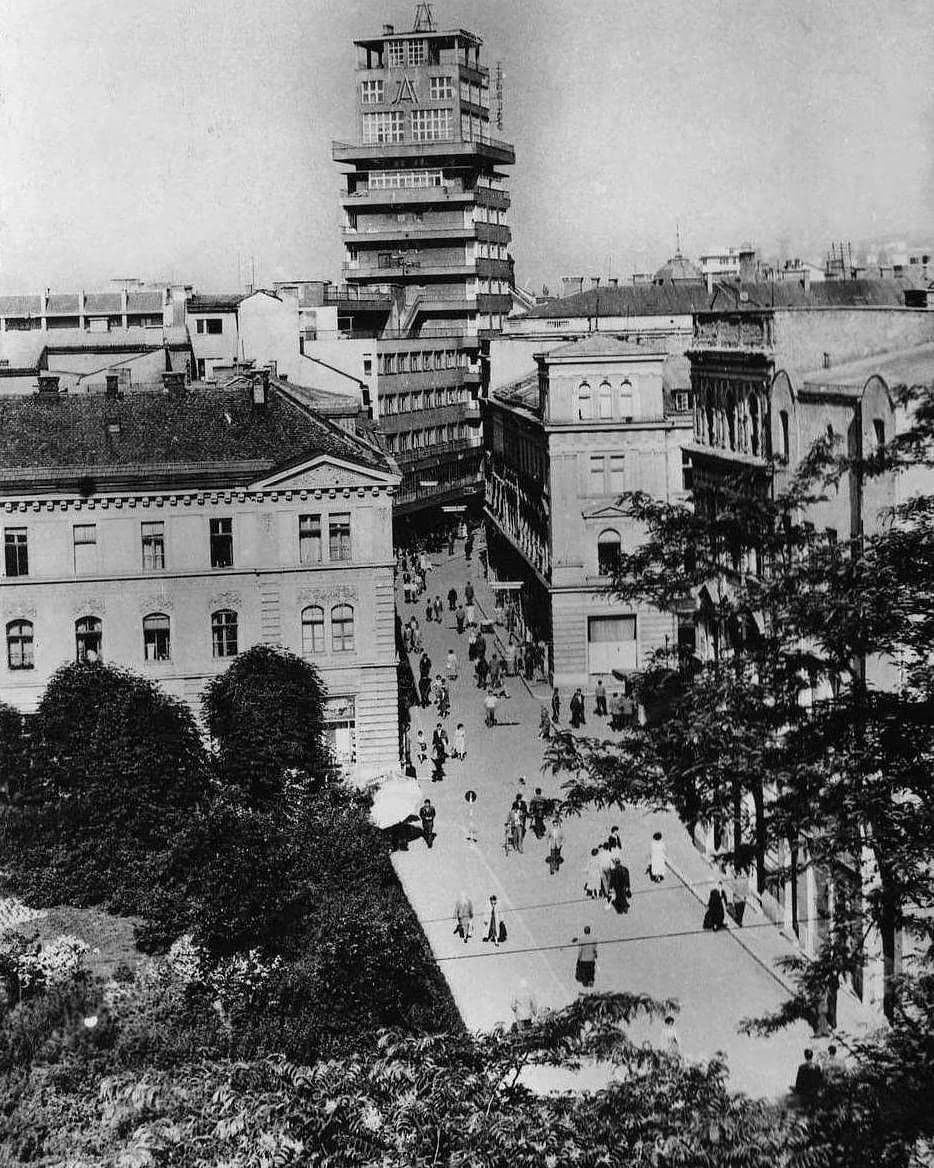
Trg Oslobodjenja & JAT building on Ferhadija

The square today

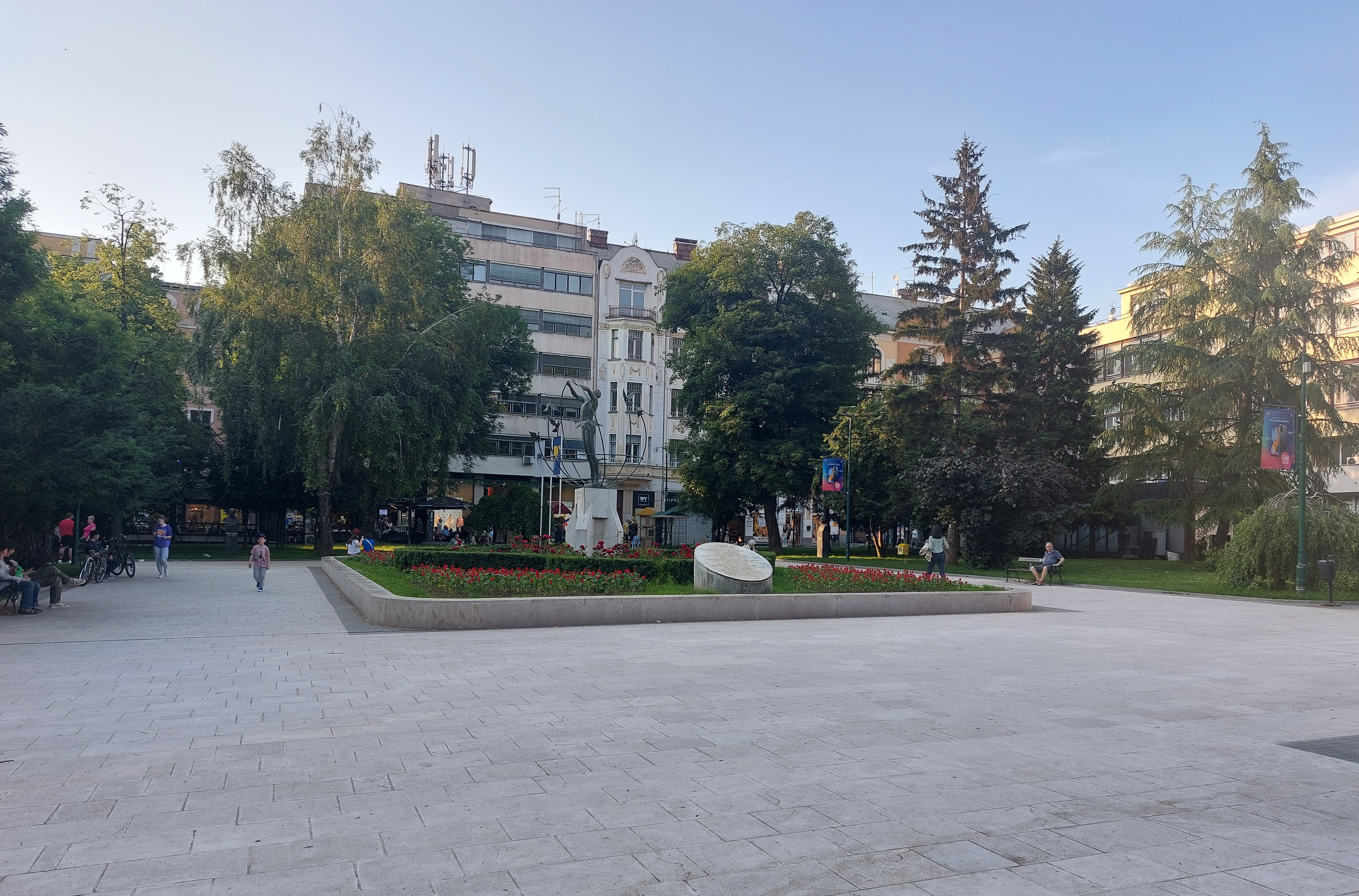
The square in 2023

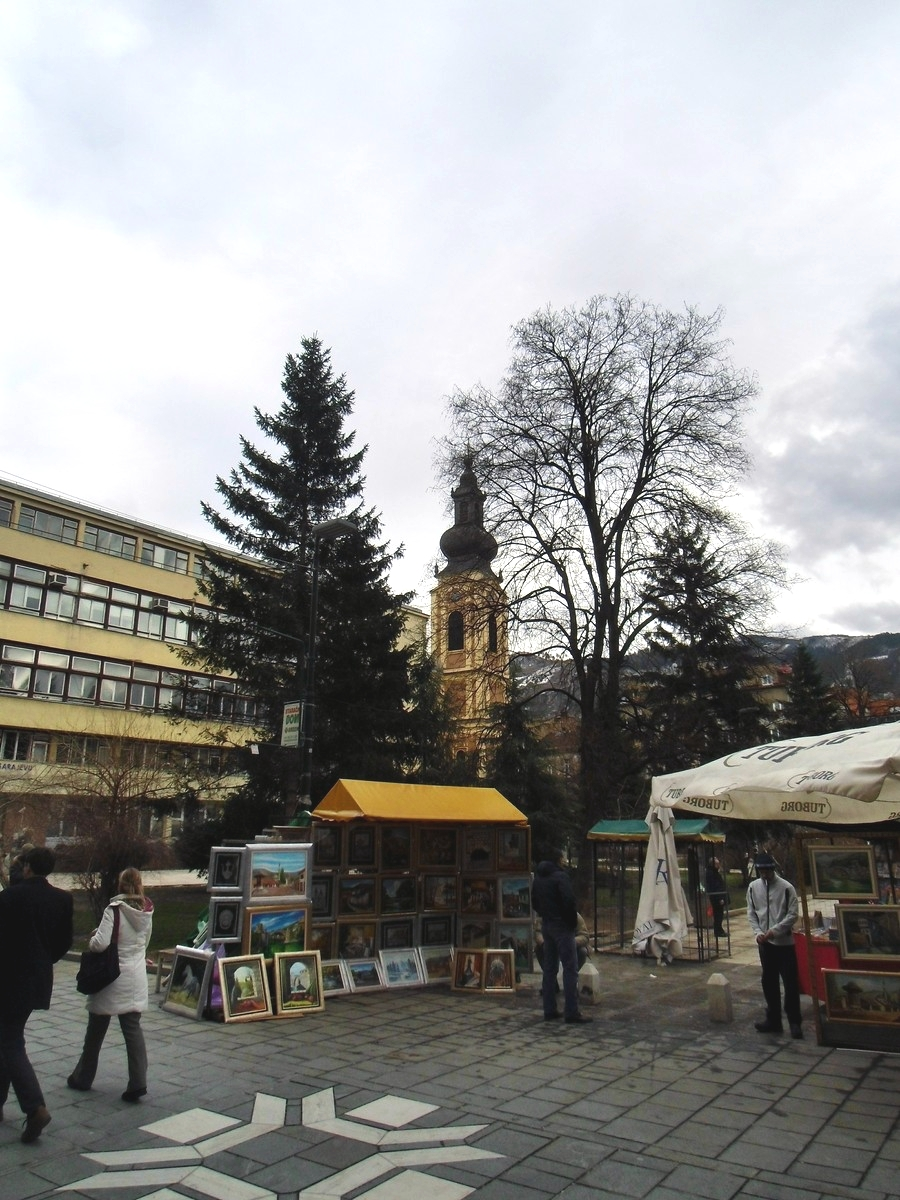
Symbol of the 1984 Sarajevo olympics

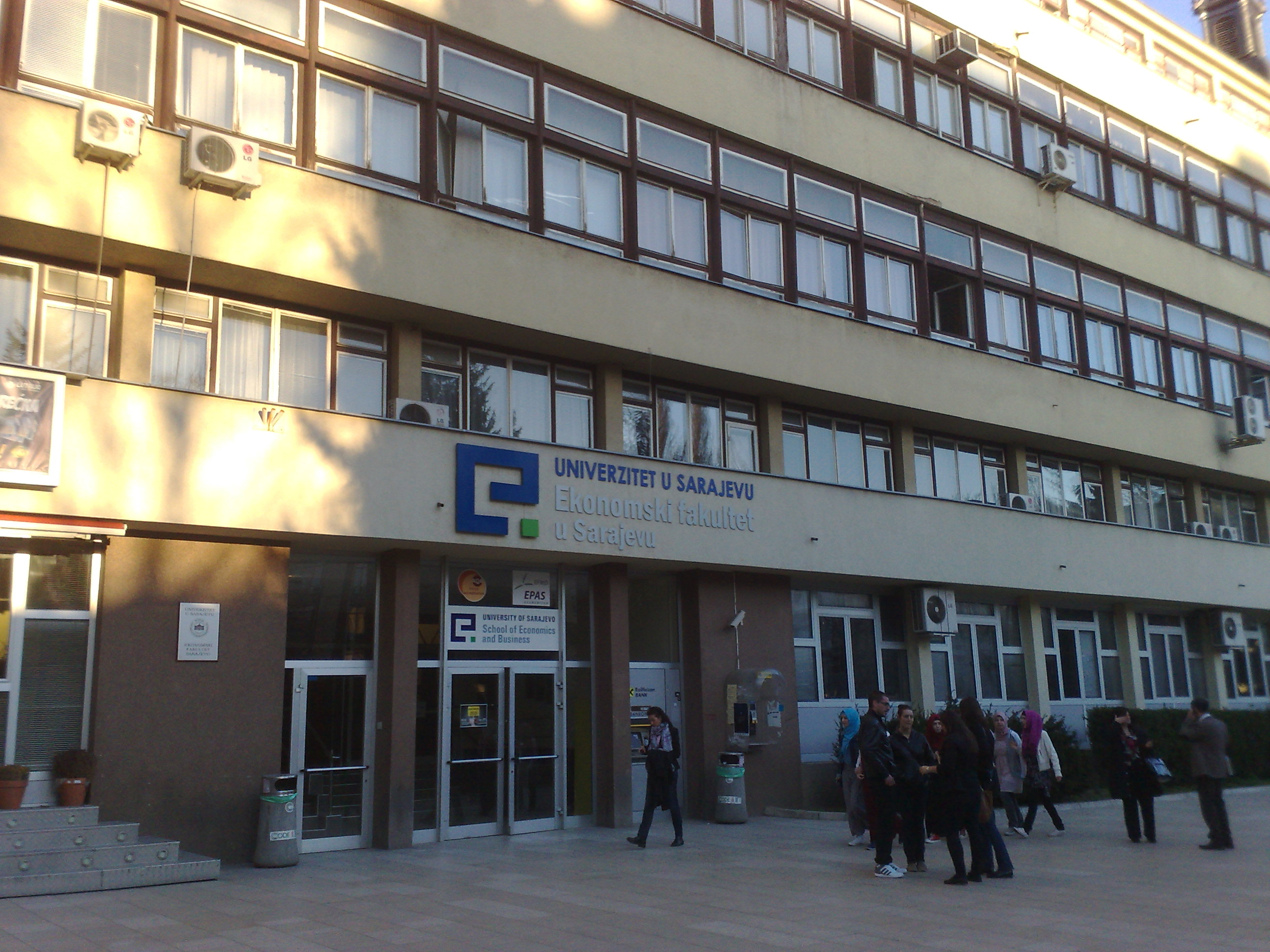
University of Sarajevo School of Economics and Business

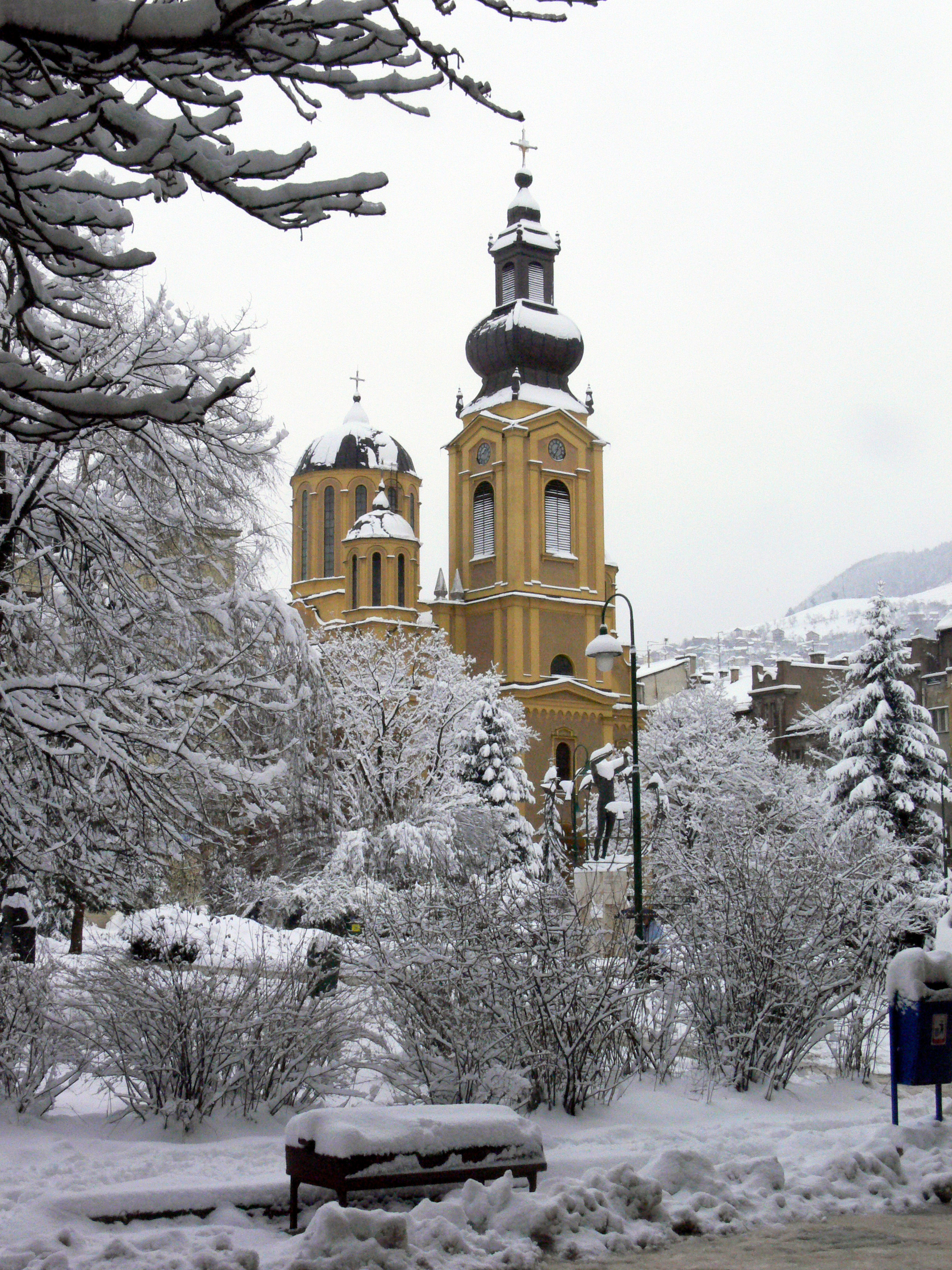
Square and Orthodox Cathedral under the snow

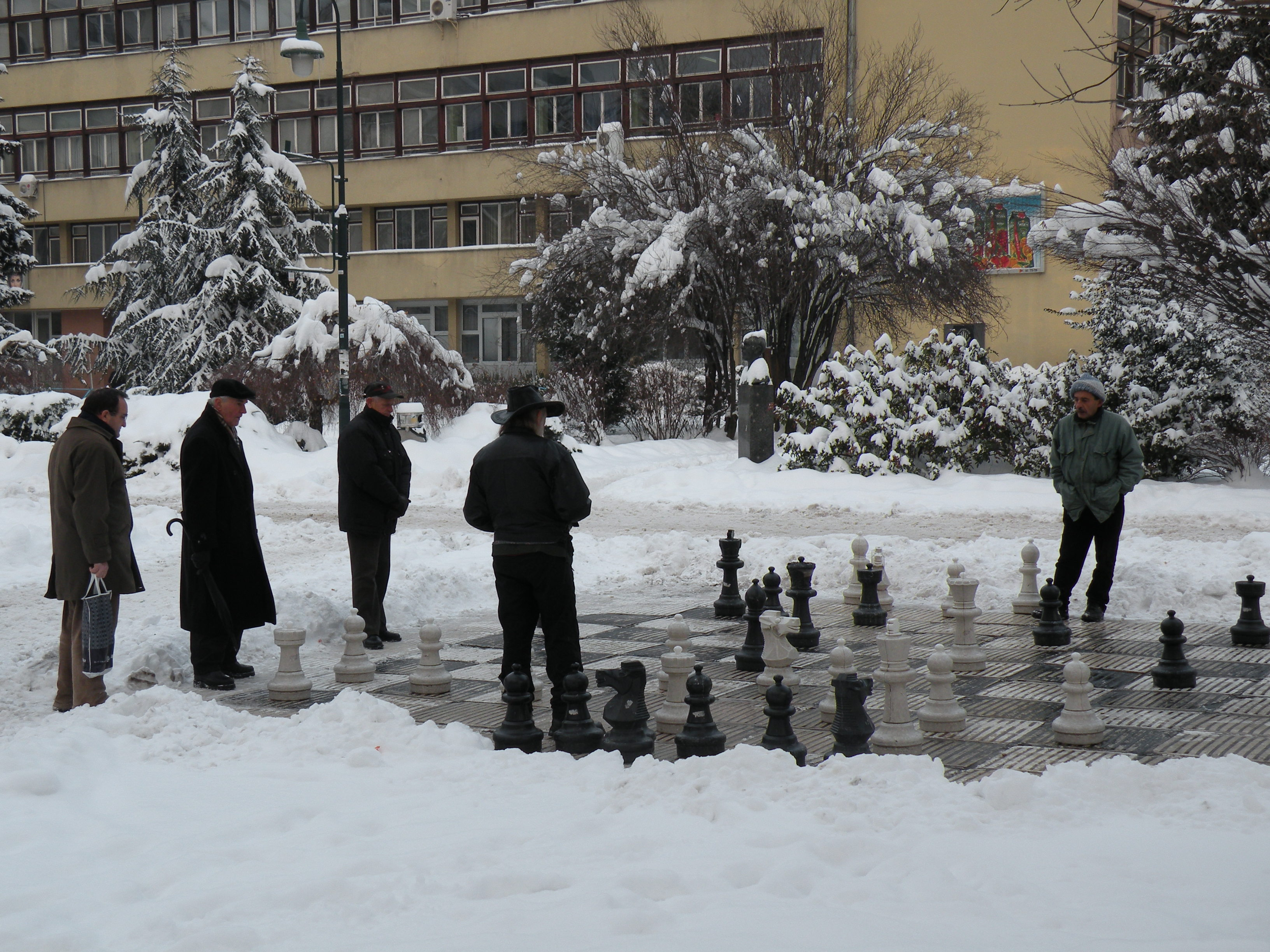
Chess playing

Busts of Bosnian writers

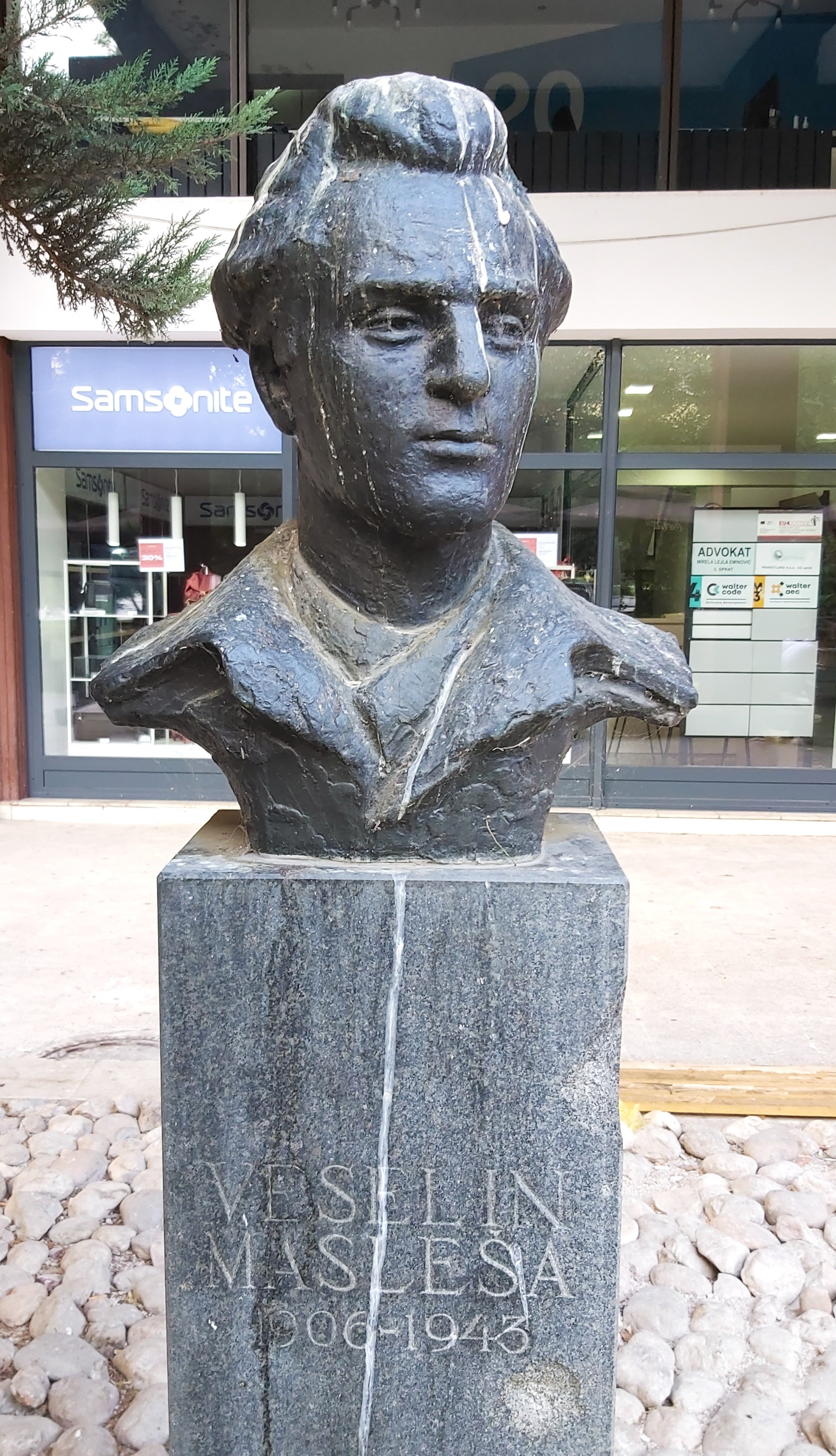
Veselin Masleša

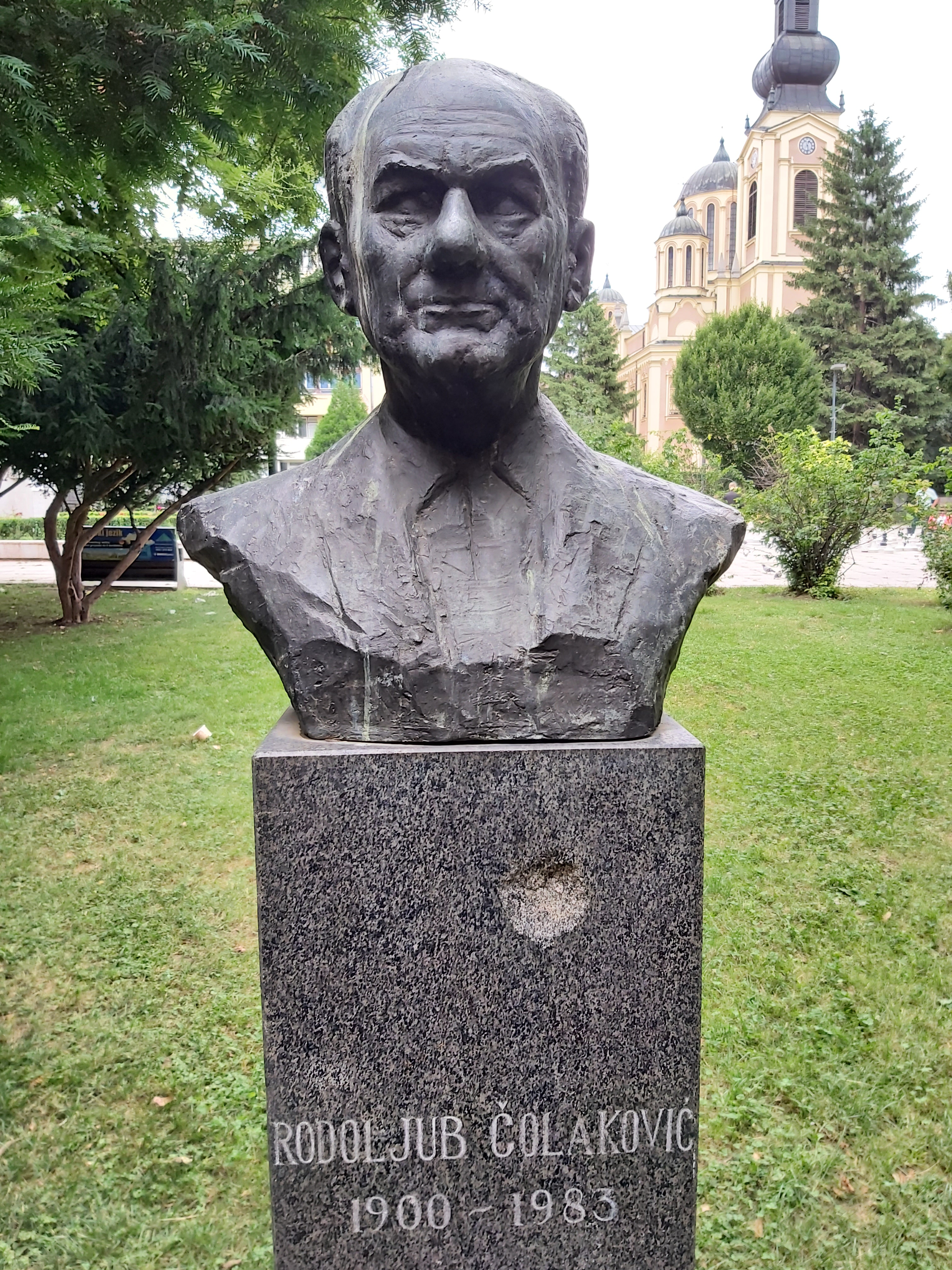
Rodoljub Čolaković

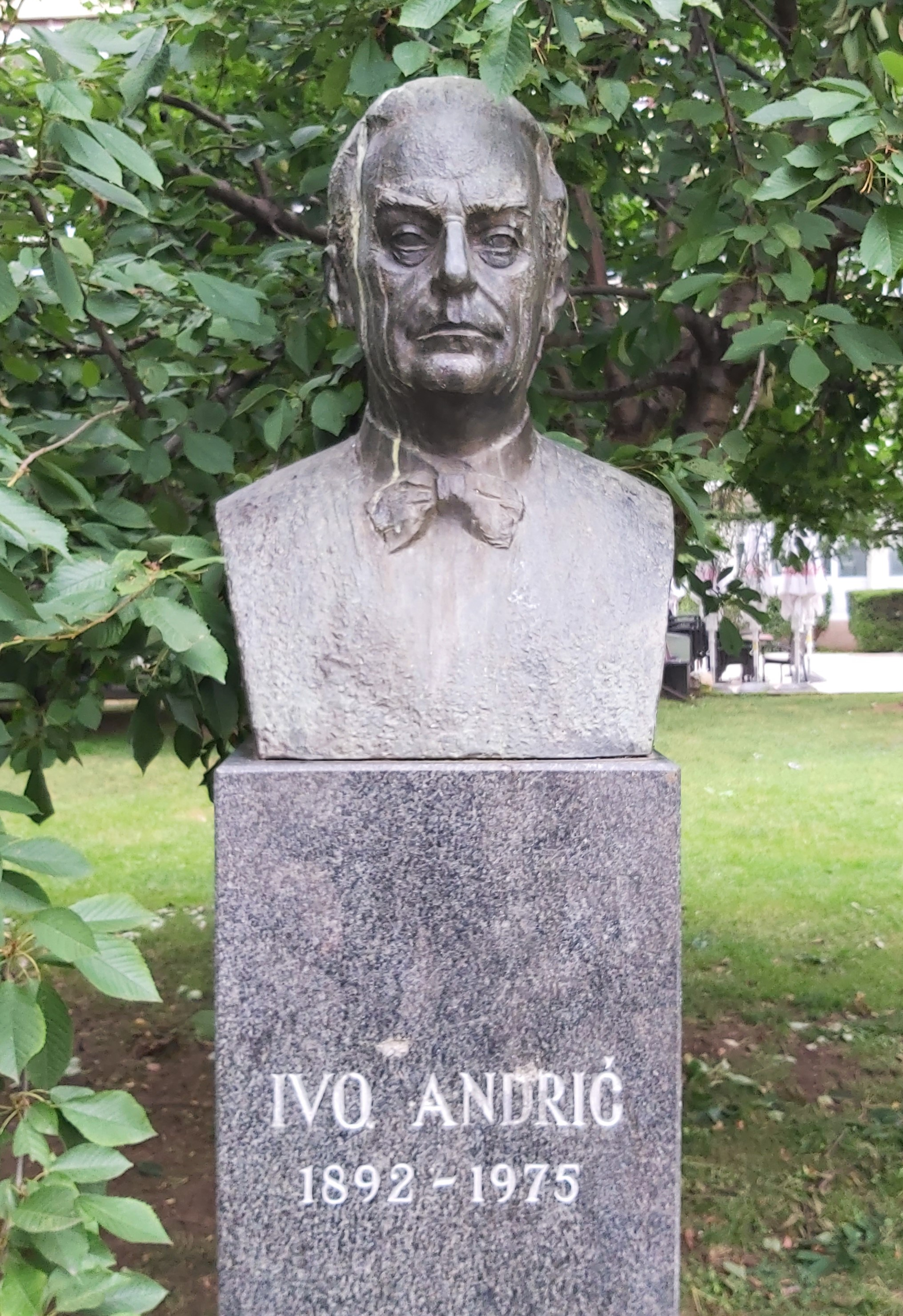
Ivo Andrić

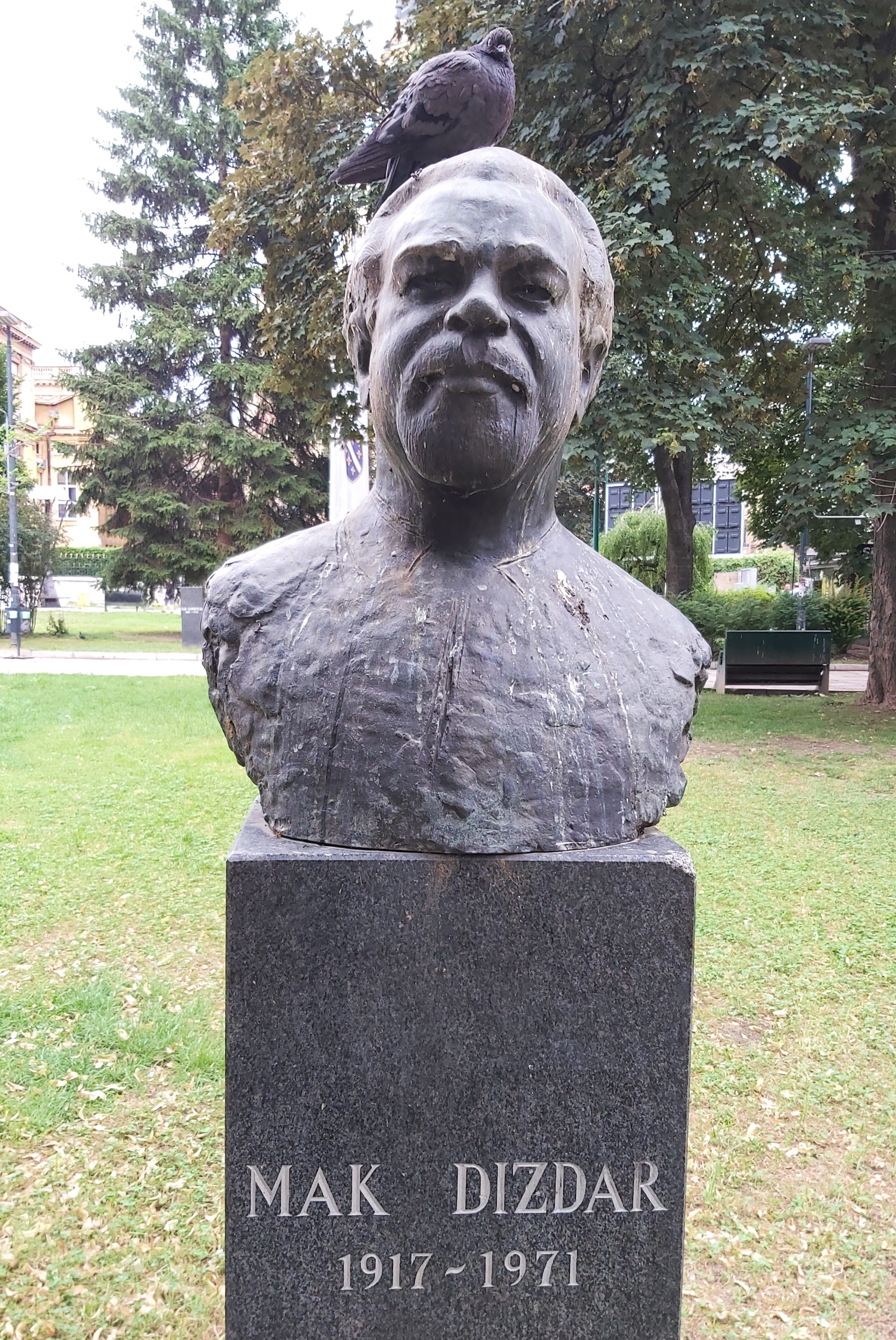
Mak Dizdar

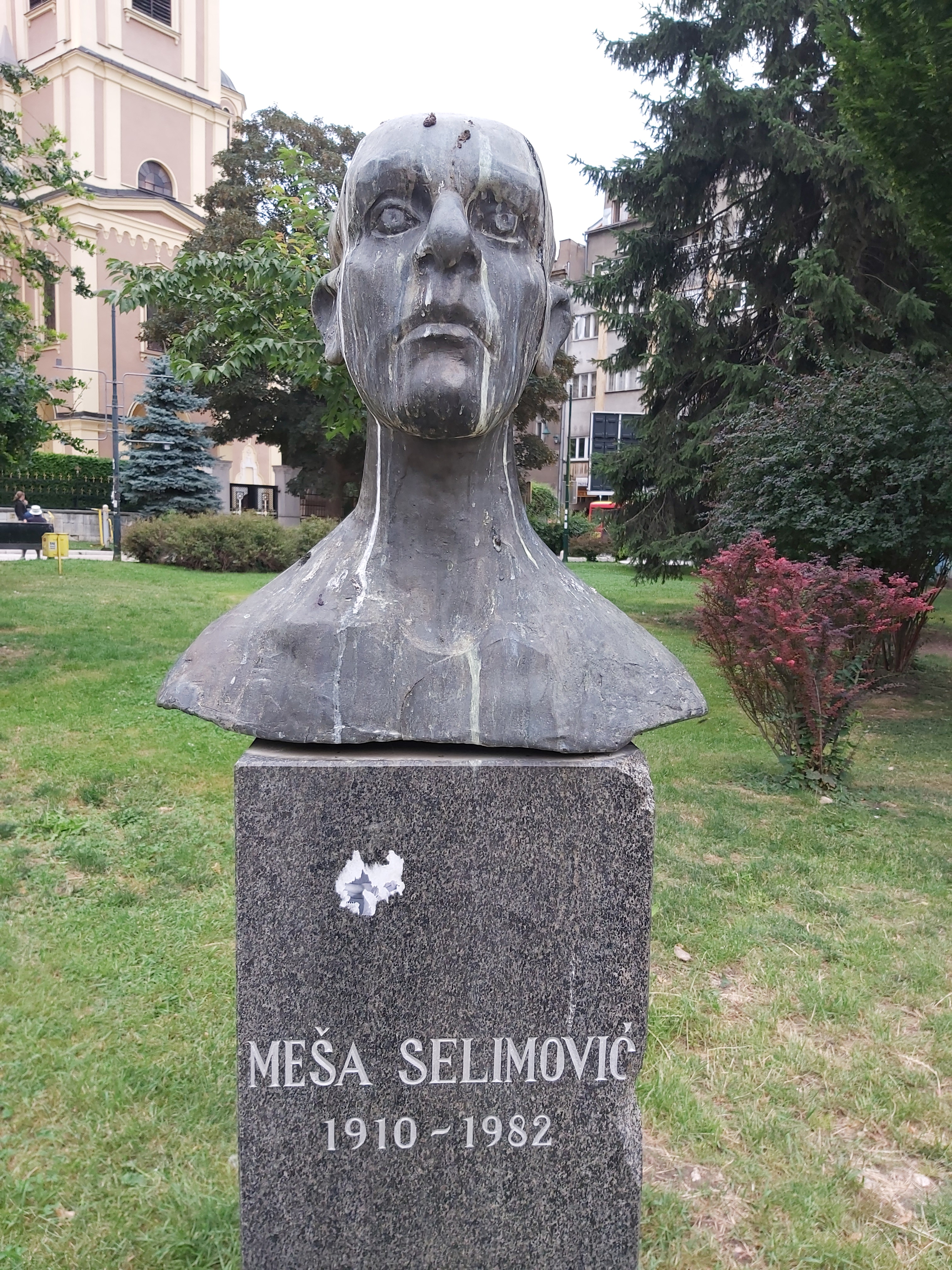
Meša Selimović

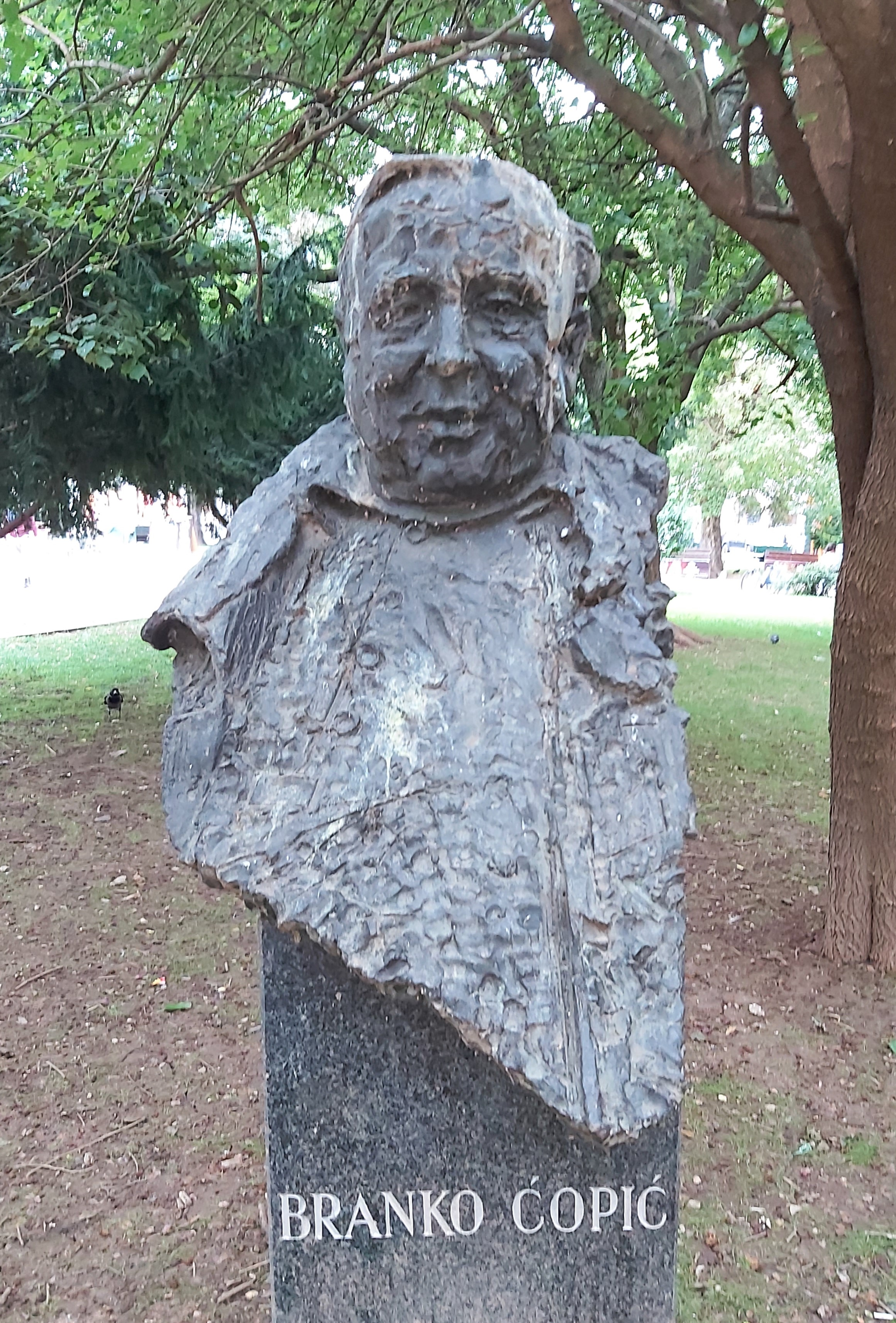
Branko Ćopić
