= Sarajevo Music Academy =

Faculty of Music of the University of Sarajevo

- Muzička akademija Univerziteta u Sarajevu
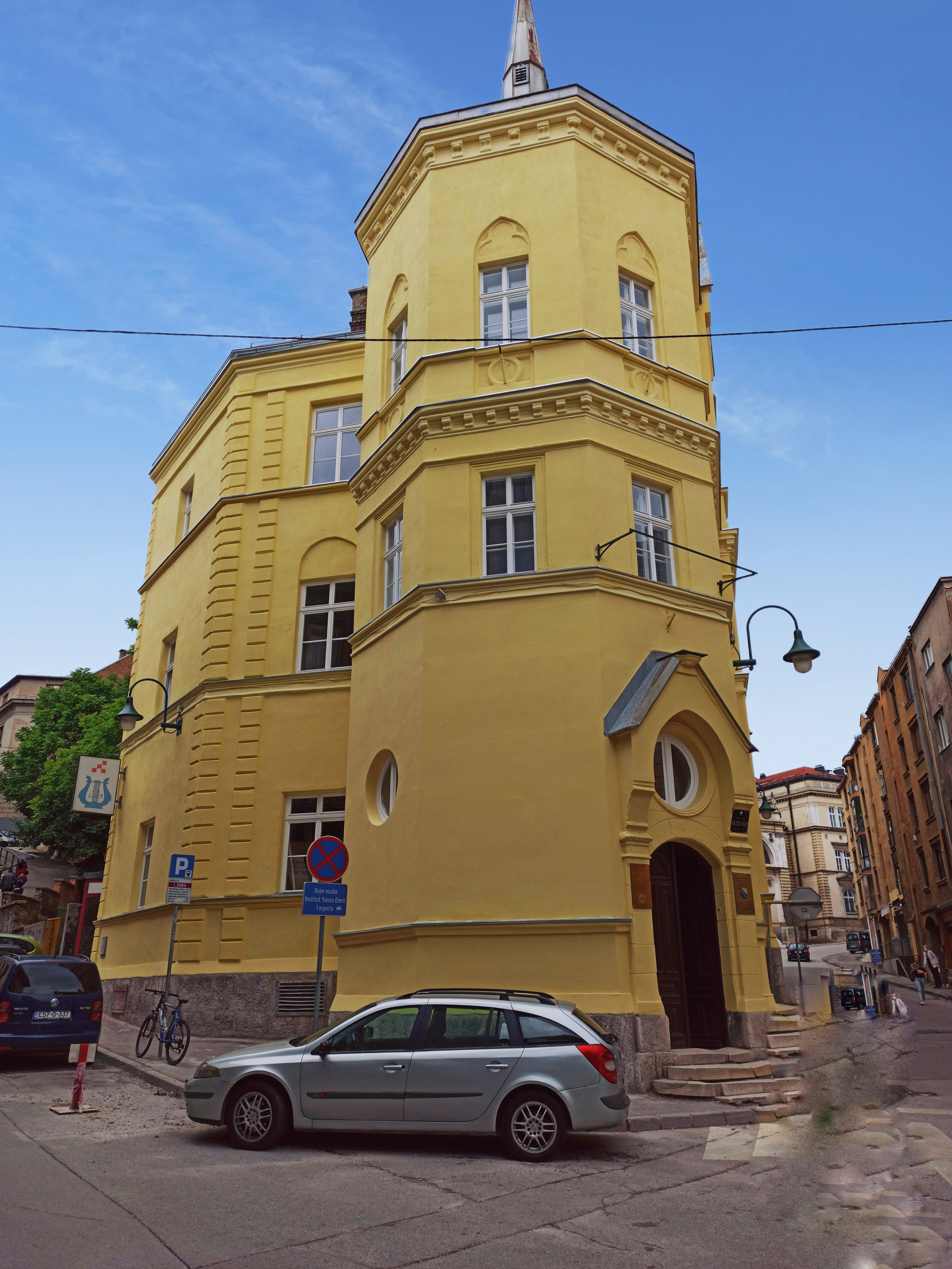
- Type: Faculty of Music
- Established: 1955; 71 years ago
- Affiliations: University of Sarajevo
- Dean: Ališer Sijarić
- Students: 500
- Location: Josipa Štadlera 1/II, Sarajevo, Bosnia and Herzegovina; 43°51′37″N 18°25′29″E
- Nickname: MAS
- Website: www.mas.unsa.ba

The Sarajevo Music Academy (Muzička Akademija Univerziteta u Sarajevu; abbreviated MAS) is a Faculty of Music of the University of Sarajevo in Bosnia and Herzegovina.

== History ==
=== Founding and early years (1955–1991) ===
The Sarajevo Music Academy was founded by a decision of the National Assembly of Bosnia and Herzegovina on 20 May 1955, as the fourth higher education institution of its kind in the former Yugoslavia, and the first established after World War II. This decision was published in the Official Gazette of the People's Republic of Bosnia and Herzegovina No. 12/55 on 8 June 1955.

Its founding was preceded by a number of favorable developments, including the establishment of a network of music schools, the founding of the National Theatre, the Sarajevo Opera House, the Symphony Orchestra of RTV Sarajevo, the Institute for the Study of Folklore, and the continued activity of the Sarajevo Philharmonic Orchestra.

The founders of the Academy were:

- Milenko Živković, Rector of the Academy of Music in Belgrade
- Dragotin Cvetko, Professor at the Academy of Music in Ljubljana
- Natko Devčić, Professor at the Academy of Music, University of Zagreb
- Cvjetko Rihtman, Director of the Folklore Research Institute in Sarajevo
- Miroslav Špiler, Professor at the Higher Pedagogical Academy in Sarajevo
- Strahinja Dramušić, representing the Council for Education, Science and Culture of the People's Republic of Bosnia and Herzegovina, as a rapporteur

After the formation of the first teaching staff, Rihtman was elected as the first Rector. In its inaugural academic year, the Academy enrolled 42 students. Classes began on 19 December 1955 in seven departments:

1. Department of Composition and Conducting
2. Department of Solo Singing
3. Department of Piano
4. Department of String Instruments
5. Department of Wind Instruments
6. Department of Musicology
7. Theoretical-Pedagogical Section

=== Bosnian War and resilience (1992–1995) ===
The tragic events that struck the former Yugoslavia in the 1990s left the Academy without many of its teachers and associates, and the building was severely damaged on six separate occasions. One of the shell holes in the wall between the concert hall and the hallway was deliberately preserved by the Academy’s management as a symbol of those difficult times. Many students left Sarajevo; of the 45 full-time teachers and assistants, only fifteen remained, and the Academy lost two-thirds of its staff. Temporary lecturers from other institutions were occasionally hired, and the number of students dropped to around 50. Teaching was further hindered by the lack of adequate facilities.

Despite these challenges, instruction was interrupted only once, for a short period in May 1995, due to intense shelling. Instrumental teachers often held classes in their own homes, both for safety and due to the lack of usable space. In spite of the hardships, the remaining staff maintained their professional and human dedication. In addition to preserving the teaching process, the Academy’s teachers played a key role in establishing the Orchestra of the Armed Forces of Bosnia and Herzegovina, reviving the Sarajevo Philharmonic, and re-establishing the academic choir Gaudeamus.

Thanks to the efforts of then-dean Osman-Faruk Sijarić, and with substantial support from music academies and conservatories in Vienna, Bern, Graz, Karlsruhe, Madrid, and Stockholm, the Sarajevo Music Academy was unanimously accepted as a member of the European Association of Conservatoires.

During the war, 15 students earned bachelor’s degrees, two completed master’s degrees, and one doctoral dissertation was defended. Despite enormous difficulties, the Academy succeeded in fulfilling its core mission throughout almost the entire final decade of the 20th century.

=== Post-war recovery and modern era (1996–present) ===
Over the course of more than 62 years, the Academy has produced over 2,000 graduates, around 200 master’s degree holders, and about 20 doctoral degree recipients. Around 300 teachers and associates have contributed to its work. Despite significant political, social, and other upheavals that affected all aspects of its functioning, the Academy is now led by a new generation of professors and is internationally recognised as an institution with well-developed departments, accredited academic programs, and active artistic, and scientific output.

== Departments ==
The Academy has eight Departments, one Institute of Musicology and one Center of Music Education:

- Department of Composition and Electronic music
- Department of Conducting
- Department of Solo-Singing
- Department of Piano, Harp and Percussion
- Department of String Instruments
- Department of Wind Instruments and Accordion
- Department of Musicology and Ethnomusicology
- Department of Music Theory and Pedagogy
- Institute of Musicology
- Center of Music Education

== Degree Programs ==
Educational process at the Sarajevo Music Academy is carried out in three cycles of study:

- The Bachelor's program (BA) lasts four years carrying 240 ECTS credits
- The Master's program (MA) lasts one year carrying 60 ECTS credits
- The Doctoral program (PhD) and Doctor of musical arts (DMA) lasts three years carrying 180 ECTS credits

== Music Festivals at the Sarajevo Music Academy ==
Sarajevo Music Academy participates in organization of following music festivals:

- Majske Muzičke Svečanosti
- Sarajevo Chamber Music Festival
- Sonemus Fest
- Sarajevo International Guitar Festival
- INSAM Institute for Contemporary Artistic Music

== Ensembles, Choir and Orchestra of Sarajevo Music Academy ==
- String Orchestra
- Mixed Choir
- Female Choir
- Symphony Orchestra
- Ansambl Etnoakademik

== Alumni & Past Achievements ==
The Academy has over 2,500 graduates, more than 200 Master of Arts and Music Sciences, 20 Doctors of Music Sciences and 5 Doctor of Musical Arts. It also publishes the monthly student music magazine "Music".

== List of Former Deans ==
- Academic Cvjetko Rihtman, ethnomusicologist and composer (1955–1959)
- Miroslav Špiler, composer (1959–1963)
- Matusja Blum, piano pedagogy (1963–1967)
- Academic Teodor Romanić, conductor (1967–1972)
- Matusja Blum, piano pedagogy (1972–1976)
- mr. Zdravko Verunica, music theorist (1976–1981)
- dr. Zija Kučukalić, musicologist (1981–1983)
- mr. Milica Šnajder, pianist (1983–1985)
- mr. Dunja Rihtman-Šotrić, ethnomusicologist (1985–1987)
- mr. Osman-Faruk Sijarić, violinist (1987–2003)
- dr. Selma Ferović, music theorist (2003–2007)
- dr. Ivan Čavlović, music theorist (2007–2016)
- dr. Senad Kazić, music theorist (2016–2020)

== See also ==
- University of Sarajevo
- Academy of Fine Arts Sarajevo
- Academy of Performing Arts in Sarajevo
- List of university and college schools of music
- European Association of Conservatoires
- INSAM Institute for Contemporary Artistic Music
- Sonemus Fest
- Sarajevo International Guitar Festival
