= Uglješa Uzelac =

Bosnian politician (1938–1997)

27th Mayor of Sarajevo
- In office 1983–1985
- Preceded by: Emerik Blum
- Succeeded by: Kemal Hanjalić

Personal details
- Born: 1938 Ivanjska, Bosanska Krupa, Kingdom of Yugoslavia
- Died: 6 September 1997 (aged 58–59) Ljubljana, Slovenia
- Party: League of Communists of Bosnia and Herzegovina
- Education: University of Sarajevo (BEc)

Uglješa Uzelac (1938 – 6 September 1997) was a Bosnian politician and diplomat who served as the 27th mayor of Sarajevo from 1983 to 1985. He was also Bosnia and Herzegovina's ambassador to Slovenia from 1992 until his death in 1997.

Uzelac was the president of the Basketball Federation of Yugoslavia from 1989 to 1991 as well. He was most notably mayor during the 1984 Winter Olympics in Sarajevo.

== Biography ==
Uzelac was born in 1938 in the village of Ivanjska, Bosanska Krupa near Banja Luka. He was educated in Sarajevo, where he graduated from the Faculty of Economics and Business. He worked at the UPI Bank of Sarajevo, and was also director of it.

Uzelac was the president of the Assembly of KK Bosna, President of the Basketball Federation of Yugoslavia and a member of the Organizing Committee of the 1984 Winter Olympics in Sarajevo. He served as the 27th Mayor of Sarajevo from 1983 until 1985 and was mayor during the Winter Olympics.

Uzelac died on 6 September 1997, while serving as Bosnia and Herzegovina's ambassador to Slovenia.

Political offices
Preceded by Emerik Blum	Mayor of Sarajevo; 1983–1985	Succeeded by Kemal Hanjalić
