= Sarajevo International Guitar Festival =

Annual festival in Sarajevo, Bosnia

- Genre: Classical guitar
- Dates: April
- Locations: Sarajevo, Bosnia and Herzegovina
- Years active: 2011 – present
- Founders: Association of Guitarists in Bosnia and Herzegovina
- Organiser: Fabrice Lamproie; Sarajevo Music Academy; Pro Helvetia
- Website: sigf.ba

The Sarajevo International Guitar Festival (Bosnian: Međunarodni festival gitare Sarajevo / Међународни фестивал гитаре Сарајево) is an international multi-day classical guitar music festival which annually takes place in Sarajevo, Bosnia and Herzegovina. It was established in 2011, and has been a full member of EuroStrings since 2017. The festival has hosted numerous international names such as Margarita Escarpa, Rovshan Mamedkuliev, Sérgio Assad, Juanjo Domínguez, Le Trio Joubran, Roland Dyens, Dušan Bogdanović, Yorgos Foudoulis, Petar Čulić, Hubert Käppel, Pablo Márquez and others.

== History ==
The Sarajevo International Guitar Festival was founded in 2011 by the Association of Guitarists in the Federation of Bosnia and Herzegovina, in an effort to promote classical guitar music and education within the region. Đani Šehu, a Bosnian guitarist and educator, serves as the festival’s director.

Since its inception, SIGF has hosted over 27 concerts featuring artists from countries such as Austria, Azerbaijan, Brazil, Croatia, England, France, Germany, Greece, Italy, Montenegro, the Netherlands, Russia, Serbia, Spain, Turkey, and the United States. The festival’s educational component has seen participation from lecturers from over twenty countries, with workshops attended by over 700 guitarists, teachers, and professors.

== Locations ==
Pablo "Mezcla" Menéndez performance, 2025.

SIGF events are hosted at various venues across Sarajevo, including:

- Sarajevo National Theatre
- Bosniak Institute
- Sarajevo Music Academy
- House of the Armed Forces of Bosnia and Herzegovina

== Notable editions ==
- 2013 (3rd Edition): Concluded with a concert by Bosnian guitarist Sanel Redžić at the House of the Armed Forces.
- 2014 (4th Edition): Opened by Russian guitarist Anton Baranov at the House of the Armed Forces, marking a significant milestone in the festival’s history.
- 2023 (12th Edition): Featured performances by artists such as Raphaël Feuillâtre, with events held from April 27 to May 1.

== Gallery ==
Vedran Vujica at Sarajevo International Guitar Festival, 19 April 2018.

Student workshop during the 2019 edition.

Alvaro Toscano performing in 2025.

Vasilina Shashkova, 18 April 2025.
