= Emerik Blum =

Yugoslav businessman and politician (1911–1984)

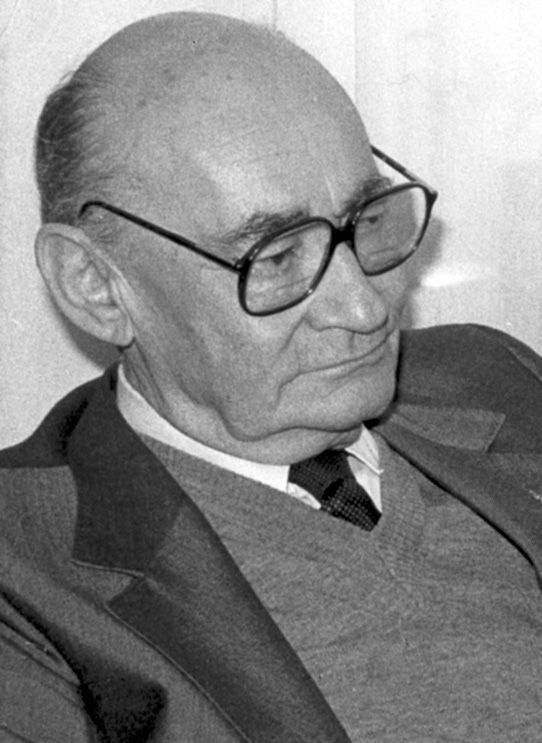

26th Mayor of Sarajevo
- In office 1981–1983
- Preceded by: Anto Sučić
- Succeeded by: Uglješa Uzelac

Personal details
- Born: 7 August 1911 Sarajevo, Condominium of Bosnia and Herzegovina, Austria-Hungary
- Died: 24 June 1984 (aged 72) Fojnica, SR Bosnia and Herzegovina, SFR Yugoslavia
- Party: League of Communists of Bosnia and Herzegovina
- Spouse: Matusja Blum (until 1984, his death)
- Education: Czech Technical University (BS)

Emerik Blum (Serbo-Croatian Cyrillic: Емерик Блум; 7 August 1911 – 24 June 1984) was a Yugoslav businessman, philanthropist and politician who served as the 26th mayor of Sarajevo from 1981 to 1983. However, he is best known for being the founder and first director of one of Southeast Europe's largest conglomerates, Energoinvest.

== Early life and education ==
Emerik Blum was born to immigrant Hungarian Jewish parents on 7 August 1911 in Sarajevo, Bosnia and Herzegovina, which was then part of Austria-Hungary. In 1939, he received his Bachelor of Science degree in Electrical Engineering from the Czech Technical University in Prague.

== Career ==
After graduating, Blum returned to Sarajevo with his wife, pianist Matusja. He was arrested on 23 June 1941 and sent to Ustasha-run concentration camps, including Jasenovac, from which he escaped in 1944.

In 1951, Blum founded and was the first director of Energoinvest, the largest company in ex-Yugoslavia, which continues working and is headquartered in Sarajevo. He was the mayor in the Ministry of Industry and Mining of the Socialist Republic of Bosnia and Herzegovina, director of "Elektrobih" and "Elektrocentar", general engineer of the General direction of the Union electric power industry, and general director of the Directorate for electric power and industry of the Yugoslav Federal Executive Council. Additionally, Blum was an assistant Minister of electric power and industry of SFR Yugoslavia and president of the Committee for electric power and industry. He also served as mayor of Sarajevo from 1981 to 1983, becoming the city's first-ever Jewish mayor.

Blum was a member of the Organizing Committee of the 1984 Winter Olympics, which were held in Sarajevo.

== Death and legacy ==
Blum entered a hospital in Fojnica in May 1984, and died there on 24 June 1984, aged 72.

There is a student association in the Czech Republic and a street in Sarajevo (former Beogradska) named after him. A documentary film, titled Blum: Masters of Their Own Destiny, depicting Blum's transformation of Energoinvest from a small studio into a major company, was released in 2024.

== Honours ==
- Sixth of April Sarajevo Award (1966)
- Légion d'honneur (1974)
- Order of the Hero of Socialist Labour (1984; posthumously)

Political offices
Preceded by Anto Sučić	Mayor of Sarajevo; 1981–1983	Succeeded by Uglješa Uzelac
