= Ališer Sijarić =

Bosnian Composer

- Born: July 8, 1969 (age 56); Sarajevo, SR Bosnia and Herzegovina, SFR Yugoslavia
- Education: Sarajevo Music Academy; Faculty of Philosophy at University of Sarajevo; University of Music and Performing Arts, Vienna
- Occupation(s): Classical music/contemporary music composer and Academic teacher
- Years active: 1984–present
- Organizations: Sarajevo Music Academy Professor, Music Composition and Computer Music

Ališer Sijarić (born July 8, 1969) is a Bosnian contemporary classical music, electroacoustic music and computer music composer.

== Education ==
Ališer Sijarić studied Composition with Josip Magdić at Sarajevo Music Academy and Musicology, Philosophy and Sociology at Faculty of Philosophy in Sarajevo. He continued his Composition studies with Michael Jarrell at University of Music and Performing Arts Vienna and attended Composition courses with Beat Furrer und Hanspeter Kyburz in Graz. He is the son of notable professor and violinist Osman-Faruk Sijarić, former dean of Sarajevo Music Academy and grandson of well-known writer Ćamil Sijarić.

== Cooperation and performances ==
He is member of the Composers group Gegenklang. Sijarić has been commissioned to write compositions by the Konzerthaus, Vienna Gesellschaft Wien, Konzerthaus Berlin, Collegium Novum Zürich, Wiener Musikverein, Kammaransemblen Stockholm, Forum Alpbach Austria, Ensemble Cantus Zagreb, Pre Art Zürich, Ensemble Zeitfluss, Manhattan String Quartet, among others. His music was performed at many international music festivals, such as Kopenhagen - Kulturhuaptstadt Europas, Wien Modern, Salzburger Festspiele, Music Biennale Zagreb, Muskiprotokoll Graz, Culturscapes Basel, Chamber Music Festival Sarajevo and many others, in Austria, Bosnia and Herzegovina, Czech Republic, Denmark, Croatia, Italy, Republic of Macedonia, Germany, Poland, Romania, USA (Carnegie Hall), Serbia, Sweden, Switzerland, Ireland. He is founder of the Society of New Music Sarajevo – SONEMUS, Sonemus Fest and since year 2001, its artistic director. He is active member of INSAM Institute for Contemporary Artistic Music.

== Music style ==
Ališer Sijarić is pioneer in the field of Contemporary Music Composition and Contemporary Music Analysis in Bosnia and Herzegovina. His approach to Music Composition, as primarily thinking process, could be described as "deconstructed thinking process", because his fundamental compositional technique is filtration of overall material. Using noise, which could be represented also through white color (which contains all tones/colors, but none of them can be solved singularly) Sijarić sets hidden layers of whole composition at the very beginning of compositional process and forms cultivated noise. It can be understood as presumed system of artificial sound spectrum organization and of apabsolute micro-sound (or partial) stability, which represents the opposite to the nature (or behavior) of noise.

Composition of "composition background" or "hidden layers source", which for many composers represent a final product, for Sijarić represents a starting point of filtration process development. Influenced by composers such as Beat Furrer, Gérard Grisey, Morton Feldman and research in the field of Philosophy, Semiology, Psychoacoustics and Electronic & Computer Music (using Computer as Composition Assistant), he developed his own compositional style.

== Academic career ==
Prof. mr. Ališer Sijarić is Professor of Music Composition, Computer Music and Orchestration at Sarajevo Music Academy of the University of Sarajevo and he is also Head of Department for Music Composition. As of June 2020 he is the new Dean of Sarajevo Music Academy

== Significant compositions ==
- "Noise Prevails" for chamber ensemble",
- "Dah" for solo flute,
- "Snakes in Time" for orchestra,
- "Drei Farben" for flute, cello and piano,
- "Innerhalb aller sprachlichen Gestaltung..." for ensemble,
- "Cross Bowing" for string quartet,
- "Capriccio Meccanico" for violin and piano
- "Deductio" for solo clarinet.
