= Orkestar OSBiH =

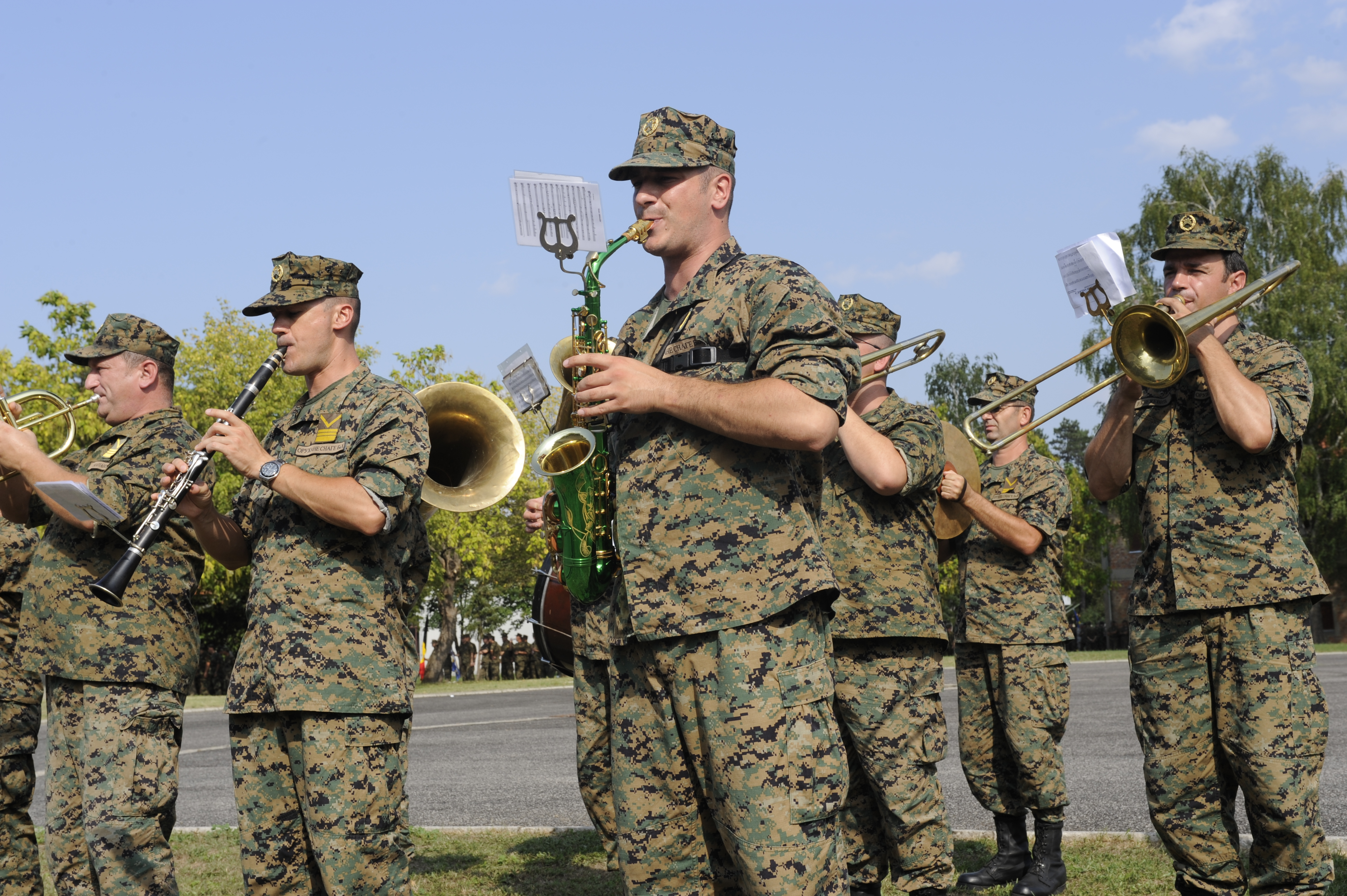
Members of the band at Kozara Barracks for Combined Endeavor 2009.

The Orkestar OSBiH (Band of the OSBiH) or as it is known officially, the Military Band of the Armed Forces of Bosnia and Herzegovina (Bosnian: Vojni orkestar Oružanih snaga BiH) is ceremonial band unit of the Armed Forces of Bosnia and Herzegovina. At the time of its creation, it was the successor to the a band of the Yugoslav People's Army based in the Socialist Republic of Bosnia and Herzegovina known as Vojni orkestar Sarajevo (Military Band Sarajevo). Alisher Sijaric, a Bosnian composer, was a member of the band in the 1990s.

It takes part in regular solo and joint concerts, many of which take place at the Army Hall in the capital. In October 2016, the band performed with the Military Band of Carinthia from Austria upon request from the Defence Ministry at Camp Butmir. In May 2018, the band performed with the visiting United States Army Europe Band and Chorus. The band performs during military parades that are held on the following holidays: Republic Day, Independence Day, Victory Day, Dayton Agreement Day, Statehood Day.

The Band of the 3rd Infantry Regiment in Republika Srpska is an affiliated band with the band of the armed forces. Based in Banja Luka, it serves as the army's military band in the other Bosnian entity Republika Srpska President Milorad Dodik rejected the participation of the band in its Republic Day commemorative celebrations.

== See also ==
- Honour Unit of Ministry of Interior of Republika Srpska
- Police Band of the Ministry of Interior of Republika Srpska
- Serbian Guards Unit
