= Matusja Blum =

Bosnian pianist and teacher (1914–1998)

Matusja Blum (1914–1998) was a Bosnian pianist and teacher. She served two terms as dean of the Sarajevo Music Academy.

A recording of a 1995 interview with her is held by the United States Holocaust Memorial Museum.

== Life ==
Blum was born in Chișinău, formerly known as Kishinev, then in Russia and now in Moldova, on 10 January 1914. She studied piano there before moving to the Prague Conservatory, from which she graduated in 1939. While in Prague she met and married Emerik Blum (1911–1984), a Bosnian politician and businessman who was Mayor of Sarajevo from 1981 to 1983. She moved to Sarajevo with him and was one of the founders of the Collegium Artisticum. She taught piano in Sarajevo and, from 1948 to 1952, worked as a pianist and music educator in Belgrade. Returning to Sarajevo she was one of the founders of the Sarajevo Music Academy (now part of the University of Sarajevo), where she was a professor and served two terms as dean from 1963 to 1964 and from 1970 to 1975.

An international piano competition, the Memorial Matusja Blum, was held in Sarajevo for the 4th time in 2024.

Blum died in Sarajevo on 25 March 1998.
