= Energoinvest =

Engineering and energy company with headquarters in Sarajevo

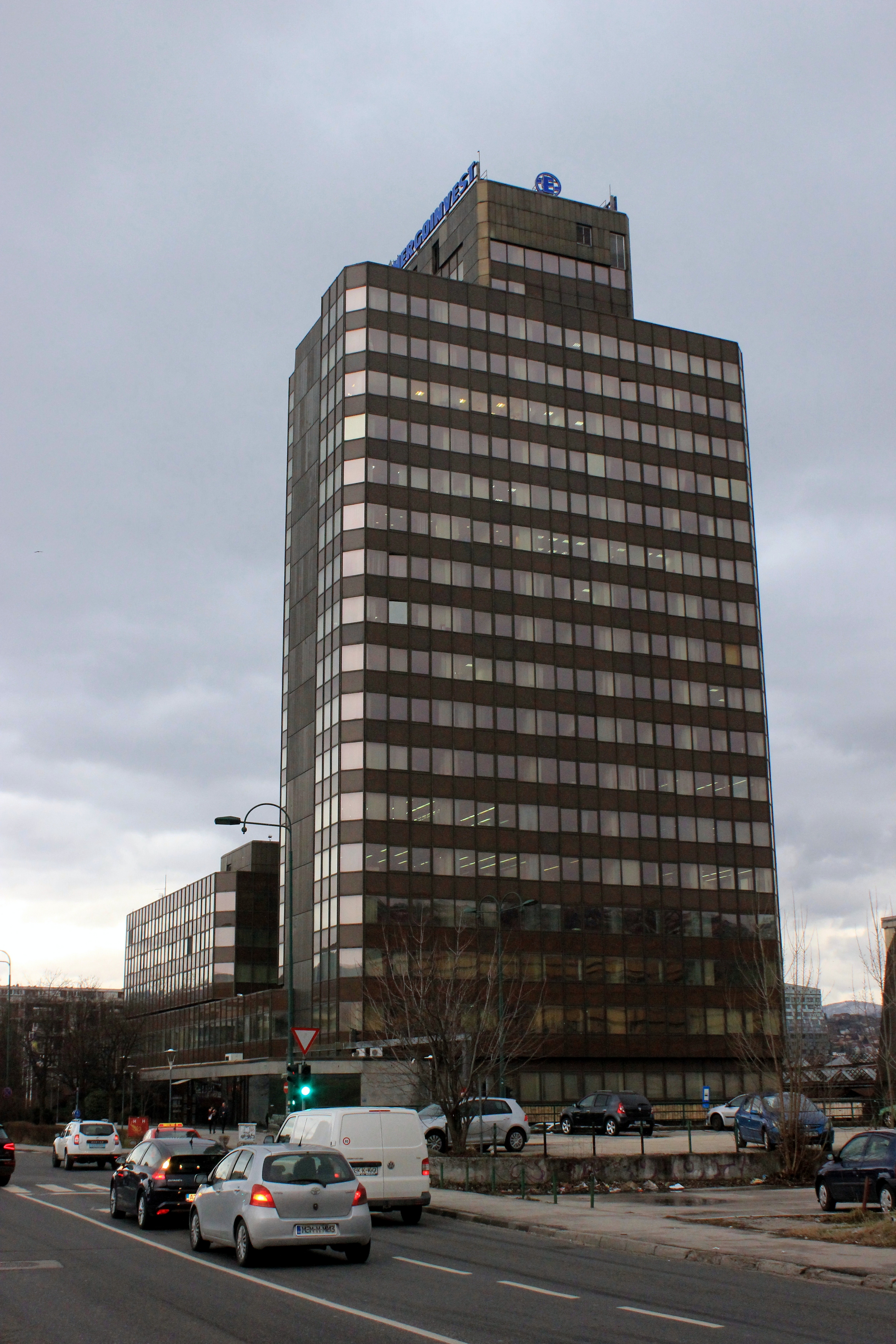
- Energoinvest Headquarters in Sarajevo
- Company type: Corporation
- Industry: Engineering
- Founded: 19 April 1951; 75 years ago
- Headquarters: Sarajevo, Bosnia and Herzegovina
- Key people: Mirza Ustamujić (Director)
- Products: Equipment, Services, and Installation for Electrical Power Generation and Transmission; Civil Constructions and Architecture, Information and Communication Technologies
- Revenue: ▲€65.84 million (2018)
- Net income: ▲ (€5.59 million) (2018)
- Total assets: ▲€106.04 million (2018)
- Total equity: €0 (2018)
- Number of employees: 350 (2018)
- Website: www.energoinvest.com

Energoinvest (full name: Energoinvest, d.d. - Sarajevo) is a Bosnian multidisciplinary engineering and energy company with headquarters in Sarajevo, Bosnia and Herzegovina.

== History ==
Energoinvest was established as a small design office under the name of "Elektroprojekt" in 1951 with Emerik Blum at the top of the company. Energoinvest has developed into a modern European company whose business is based on the system engineering model of the realized project "turnkey".

In 1958, Energoinvest was an export oriented company conducting business in markets in more than 20 countries from Mexico to Malaysia.

By 1987, Energoinvest was the largest exporter in the former Yugoslavia in reaching its business peak turnover of one billion dollars with 42,000 employees.

Energoinvest has tens of thousands of kilometers of transmission lines, thousands of substations, a number of hydro and thermal power plants, and process and industrial plants on all continents.

== See also ==
- List of companies of Bosnia and Herzegovina
- List of companies of the Socialist Federal Republic of Yugoslavia
