= University of Sarajevo School of Economics and Business =

School of Economics and Business, University of Sarajevo
- Ekonomski fakultet Univerziteta u Sarajevu
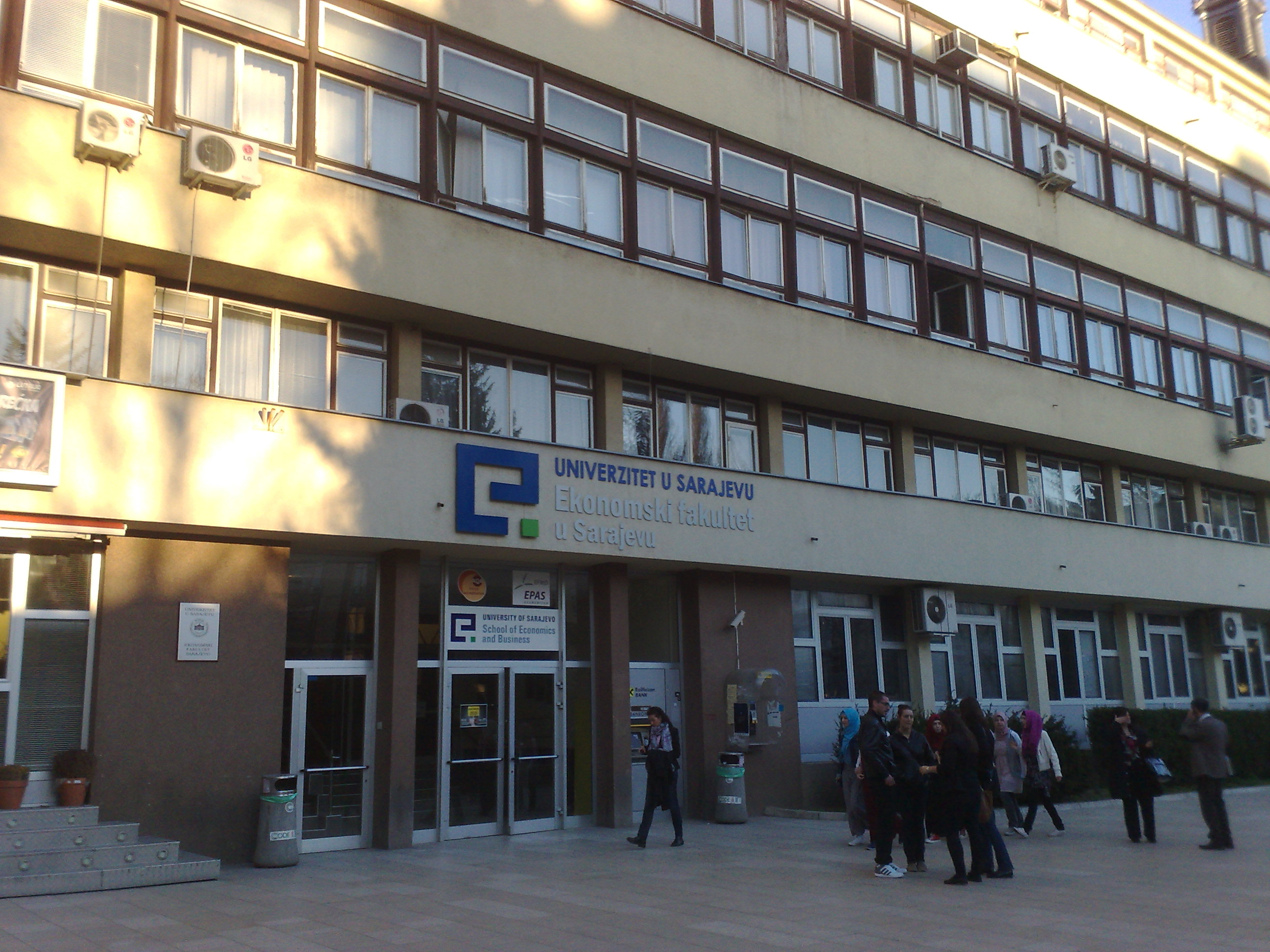
- Type: Public University
- Established: 1952; 74 years ago
- Dean: Jasmina Selimović, PhD
- Location: Bosnia and Herzegovina
- Campus: Trg Oslobođenja - Alija Izetbegović, Sarajevo
- Nickname: EFSA
- Website: efsa.unsa.ba
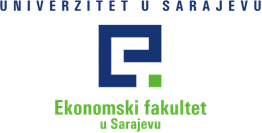

The School of Economics and Business (SEBS) is a business school affiliated with the University of Sarajevo. It is often known by its former name, the Faculty of Economics (Ekonomski Fakultet)

== History ==
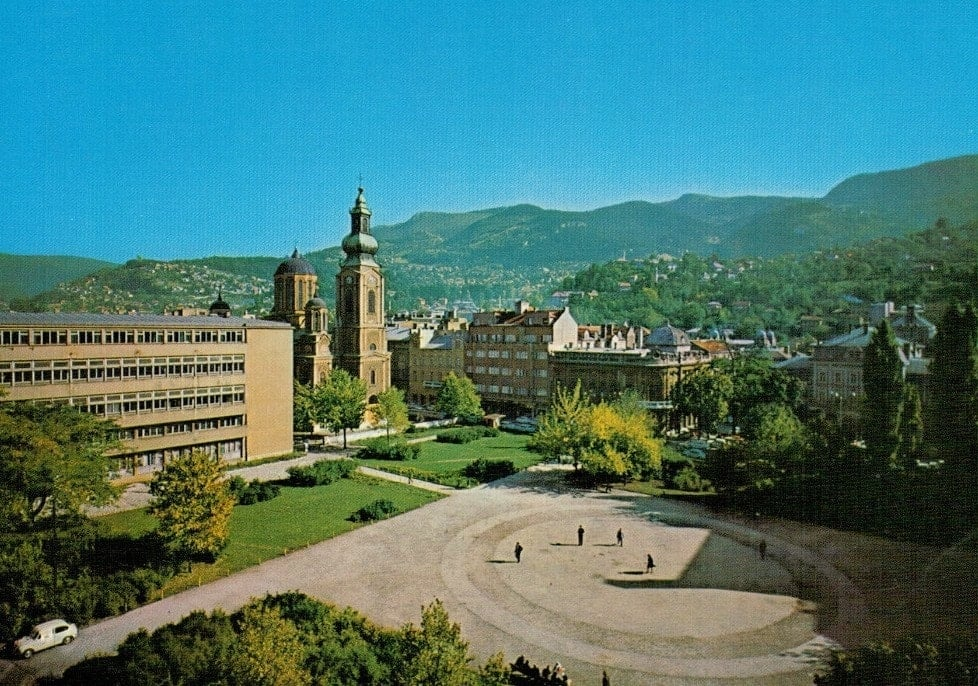
The new building of the Faculty of Economics in Trg Oslobođenja in the 1960s

Founded in July 1952, the Faculty of Economics of the University of Sarajevo was one of the four faculties of economics in socialist Yugoslavia. The first lecture was held in the building of the Palace of Justice (today's Rectorate and Faculty of Law) on 14 October 1952. Enrolments averaged 200 per year in the 1950s. The faculty moved to Trg Oslobođenja in the 1960s, and established regional centres in Banja Luka, Mostar, Tuzla and Zenica, which will later develop in other faculties of economics. In the 1970s, the faculty reached 4,100 enrolled students per year. The Institute of Economics became independent in 1974, and international cooperation started to develop. In 1985 the Higher School of Economics and Commerce was merged with the Faculty of Economics. The Business School was established in 1988.

The faculty continued to operate during the siege of Sarajevo in 1992-1995, awarding 278 graduates and 10 master's degrees, 1 specialist thesis and 4 doctoral dissertations. Seven books were published by the faculty in the four-year period. Enrolled students amounted to 7,338. In 1993, the Student Council of the Faculty of Economics became part of international student organization AIESEC on behalf of Bosnia and Herzegovina. A new postgraduate curriculum in Business Economics (Financial Management and Marketing Management) was adopted in August 1994.

The Center for Management and Information Technology (MIT Center) was opened in September 1995 with the support of the Soros Foundation - Open Society Fund BiH, and the faculty launched its first distance learning programme in 1999. The same year the Center for International Cooperation was established. EFSA introduced the ECTS system in 2001-2002. International partnerships continued, in particular on distance learning with Loyola University Chicago and the University of Alberta. The organisation structure of the faculty includes six departments:

- Department of Economic Theories and Policies
- Department of Finance and Accounting
- Department of Informatics
- Department of Quantitative Economics
- Department of Marketing
- Department of Management

The publishing house of the Faculty of Economics was established in 2000. A modern Library Information Center opened in 2001, hosting about 110,000 books and over 2,000 magazine titles. The teaching faculty amounted to 97 lecturers in 2001. The first MBA programme was established in 2004 in cooperation with the University of Delaware, and two more programmes by 2010 with the University of Turin and Griffith College Dublin. The Bologna process was implemented as of 2005-2006, with a 3+2+3 study programme. The Sarajevo Business School was established in 2008. Three faculty publications were included in the relevant bibliographic database: The South East European Journal of Economics and Business, Zbornika radova / Sarajevo Business and Economics Review and ICES Conference Proceedings. In 2012, EFSA established the Center for Islamic Economics, Banking and Finance (CIEBF), and a master's program in English language on Islamic banking in cooperation with Bolton University.

In 2019, the Faculty has 151 employees, and the total of graduate students in all study cycles since its inception is 27,015. It hosts every year the Economic Forum, Sarajevo Innovation Summit, ICES International Conference, International Conference on Official Statistics ICOS, CEO Conference for Students and High School Students, and many other events.

Accreditations, certifications

- Curriculum Management and IT system of teaching process support, Austrian Agency for Quality Assurance (AQA), 2011 (accreditation)
- EPAS accreditation for English-taught BA in Management with specializations in Marketing or Finance by the European Foundation for Management Development (EFMD), 2012
- ISO 9000:2008 (Certification)
- American accreditation house Association to Advance Collegiate Schools of Business (AACSB), 2015

Former professors

- dr. Hasan Hadžiomerović (1924-1989),
- dr. Boris Tihi (1938-2017),
- dr. Muris Čičić (born 1949) and others.

Prominent professors

- Fikret Čaušević (1963) - General Economics expert, a visiting fellow of St. Anthony's College, Oxford, members of the Academy of Sciences and Arts of Bosnia and Herzegovina.
- Kasim Tatić - Prominent figure in the study of Microeconomics

== Building ==
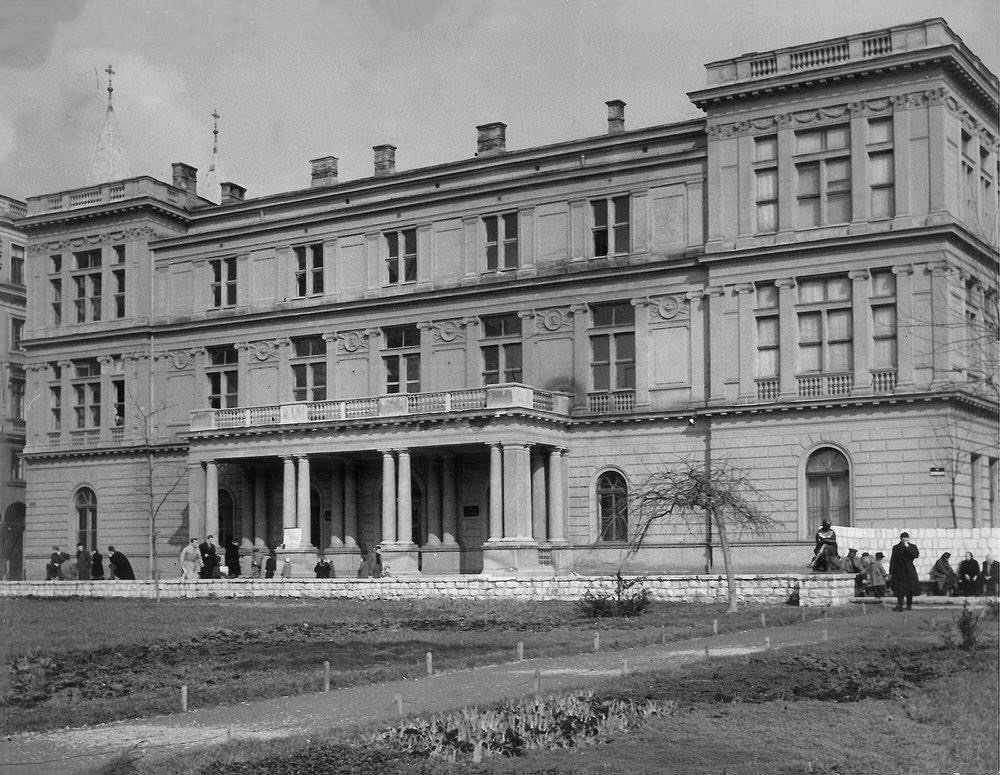
The building of the Orthodox seminary in the 1920s. In the lower right it is visible the sculpture of the Girl with the Book, which is today in front of the building of the Faculty of Architecture and Civil Engineering

The schools is hosted in a building dating from 1899, and designed by architect Rudolf Tönnies in Neo-Romanesque, right next to the Sarajevo Orthodox Cathedral from 1872, with which it stylistically expressed a close relationship. The Orthodox seminary was relocated from Reljevo to the building in 1917, and operated here for all the 1920s and 1930s, together with the "Serbian primary school for boys and girls".

During the occupation of Sarajevo by the Independent State of Croatia (NDH) in the Second World War, the building was used as a police office and prison. The building was nationalised in 1960 and used to host first the Technical (Mechanical) Faculty, and then the Faculty of Economics. A new façade in modern architectural style was added to the building for the purpose.
