= INSAM Institute for Contemporary Artistic Music =

Bosnian research institute

- Type: Research institute
- Established: 2015
- Location: Sarajevo, Bosnia and Herzegovina
- Website: www.insam-institute.com

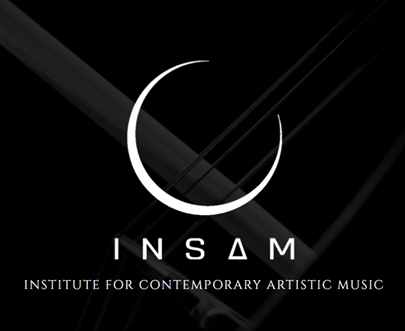
INSAM Institute Logo

INSAM Institute for Contemporary Artistic Music is Bosnian/international institute for interdisciplinary and transdisciplinary research in contemporary music and new artistic paradigms. It is based in Sarajevo (Bosnia and Herzegovina). It is the only institute for contemporary music and art research in Bosnia and Herzegovina. INSAM Institute was founded in January, 2015.

== Purpose ==
INSAM Institute works on art and scientific research, publishing musical scores and scientific work, organizing concerts, performances, exhibitions, competitions, lectures and masterclasses, and supports projects of young artists and transdisciplinary researchers.

== Departments ==
INSAM Institute consists of seven departments:

- Composition
- INSAM Sound Lab
- Musical Robots Research Lab
- Instrumental Interpretation
- Research in Music, Art Theory / Transdisciplinary Research in Art
- Archive
- INSAM Visionary Platform

== INSAM Journal of Contemporary Music, Art and Technology ==
INSAM Journal of Contemporary Music, Art and Technology is an international peer reviewed journal dealing with topical issues in contemporary art music, visual and performing arts, and technology. The Journal is issued semi-annually (in July and December) in open access electronic form. INSAM Journal is indexed in CEEOL – Central and Eastern European Online Library and RILM – Répertoire International de Littérature Musicale

The Editor-in-Chief is Bojana Radovanović Notable contributors include:Miško Šuvaković, Ališer Sijarić, Roman Yampolskiy, Gennady Stolyarov II, Zoltan Istvan, Hanan Hadžajlić, Luba Elliott, Milan Milojković, Andreja Andrić, Daniel Becker, Asher Tobin Chodos.

== Members and advisors ==
INSAM Institute has more than 60 members and advisors from Bosnia and Herzegovina, Serbia, Croatia, Montenegro, Slovenia, Ireland, Germany, Denmark, Switzerland, France, United States, Australia.
