= Army Hall (Sarajevo) =

Building in Sarajevo, Bosnia and Herzegovina

Coordinates: 43.85755700461784°N 18.424109780103603°E

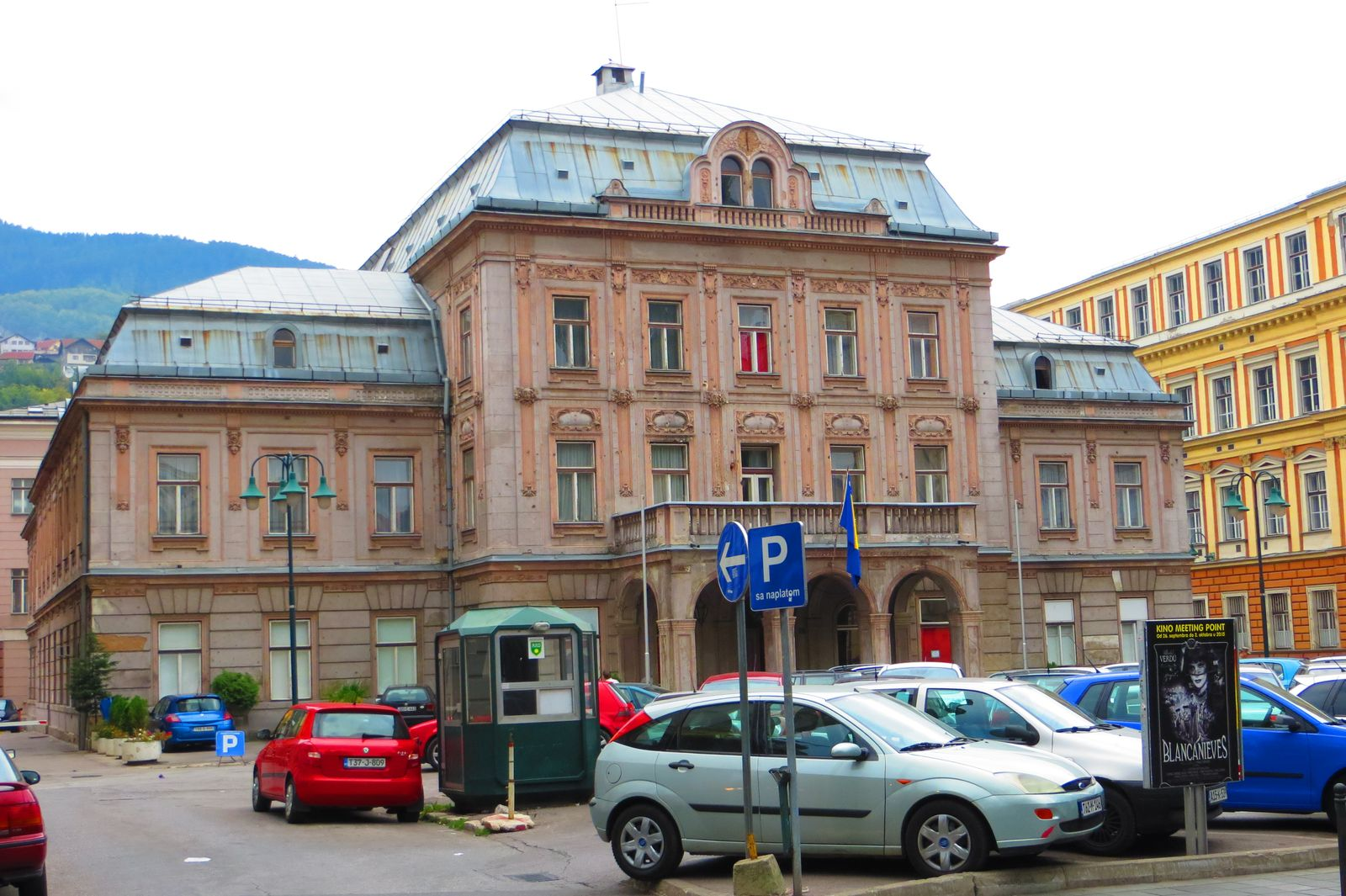
Dom Armije

The Army Hall (Bosnian: Dom Armije / Dom Oružanih snaga; Officer Casino, The Military of Federation Home) is a building in Sarajevo that was built in 1881. It was originally a casino for officers, and it was named Dom JNA (Bosnian for “Home of JNA (Yugoslav People's Army”) during the existence of Yugoslavia. Today it is a national monument consisting of the casino building with four paintings by Ismet Mujezinović.
