= Sixth of April Sarajevo Award =

Highest decoration given by Sarajevo

- Country: Bosnia and Herzegovina
- Presented by: City of Sarajevo
- First award: 1956–present
- Website: www.sarajevo.ba/bs/category/128/1

The Sixth of April Sarajevo Award (Bosnian: Šestoaprilska nagrada grada Sarajeva; Croatian: Šestotravanjska nagrada grada Sarajeva; Serbian Cyrillic: Шестоаприлска награда града Сарајева) is the highest decoration given by the city of Sarajevo. Recipients are awarded for their continuous work and achievements in the fields of science, business, education, technology, health care, art, sports, and human rights. The award is given annually by the City Assembly of Sarajevo.

== Background ==
Military operations in World War II in Yugoslavia began on 6 April 1941, when the Kingdom of Yugoslavia was swiftly conquered by Axis forces and partitioned between Germany, Italy, Hungary, Bulgaria and client regimes. Following a German bombing campaign, Sarajevo, along with the rest of Bosnia and Herzegovina, was conquered by the Ustashe Croatian fascist Independent State of Croatia, a puppet state of Nazi Germany. Many of the city's Serbs, Romani, and Jews were taken at this time and killed in the Holocaust. The city's resistance was led by Yugoslav Partisan commander, Vladimir Perić, known by his nom de guerre Walter. With an Allied victory on the horizon, Adolf Hitler personally issued a directive on 15 February 1945 ordering the holding of Sarajevo. After ferocious fighting the city was finally liberated on 6 April 1945 by the National Liberation Army of Yugoslavia. The date has since been known as Sarajevo City Day. In 1956 the City Assembly of Sarajevo established the Sixth of April Sarajevo Award.

== Recipients ==
=== 1950s ===
Godina	Individual award	Group award	Collective award
1956.	Vojo Dimitrijević	Andrija-Šain Čačin i Marijan Baldazar	not awarded
1957.	Midhat Begić; Branko Grković; Radenko Mišević; Safet Pašalić; Ivan Stajcer	not awarded	not awarded
1958.	Jolanda Đačić; Ahmet Hromadžić; Smiljan Klaić; Zdravko Kovačević; Mladen Pozajić	not awarded	not awarded
1959.	Vanda Cistler; Franjo Horvat; Tomo Janjić; Ilija Kecmanović; Jurislav Korenić; Tomo Kuruzović; Mica Todorović	not awarded	not awarded

=== 1960s ===
Godina	Individual award	Group award	Collective award
1960.	Veselin Badrov; Ivan Brkanović; Arfan Hozić; Slavko Leovac; Juraj Najdhart	not awarded	not awarded
1961.	Olga Babić; Milivoje Bačanović; Živorad Janković; Muhamed Kadić; Todor Kruševac; Hamid Lukavac	not awarded	Pozorište lutaka Sarajevo
1962.	Boro Grigovorić; Dragan Kulidžan; Rizo Ramić; Meša Selimović; Miroslav Špiler	Svetozar Radojčić, Josif Enriko, Slobodan Jovičić i Muhamed Karamehmedović	not awarded
1963.	David Finci; Ljubo Lah; Željko Marjanović; Branko Rabar; Teodor Romanić; Risto Trifković; Zlatko Ugljen	not awarded	not awarded
1964.	Nail Alajbegović; Eduard Bogdanić; Mak Dizdar; Paško Duplančić; Glibo Šašić; Vlado Jablan; Niko Jovičević; Esad Kazazović; Franjo Likar; Zvonko Oreb; Strahinja Petrović; Zdenko Praskač; Fahrudin Sabrihafizović; Miloš Samardžić; Vladimir Zarahović; Miloš Žarković	not awarded	not awarded
1965.	Josip Bać; Esad Bajraktarević; Rejhan Demirdžić; Branislav Đurđev; Momčilo Jovanović; Čedo Kisić; Hajrudin Krvavac; Dragan Milinović; Ljiljana Molnar; Dako Radošević; Ranko Rakanović; Afan Ramić; Salem Resulović; Marko Slomović; Luka Sorajić; Dane Škerl; Ljubomir Šušić; Husein Tahmiščić	– Zvonko Knežević i Zdravko Pujić – Ivan Štraus i Tihomir Štraus	not awarded
1966.	Abdurezak Abduzaimović; Jan Beran; Emerik Blum; Ismet Brkić; Vlatko Filipović; Mario Mikulić; Ibro Mujezinović; Predrag Palavestra; Ina Samokovlić-Krstanović; Boris Smoje; Avdo Sućeska; Dževad Taletović; Helena Uhlik-Horvat	– Miodrag Bogićević, Slavko Leovac, Husein Tahmiščić i članovi redakcije Izraza: Anđelko Ristić, Valerija Škrinjar, Izet Muftić, Dragoljub Jović, Enes Čengić, Dušan Lončarević, Svetozar Malešev, Zvonimir Požar, Lazo Ciganović, Maja Dragutinović, Nikola Ivanović i Višnja Maloković – Dušan Jovičić, Šalom Altarac, Mirko Manojlović, Rudi Stojak, Aiša Tomašev, Miloš Bajović, Stevo Opačić, Mirko Radišić, Jovan Vasić i Rasim Bajraktarević – Žika Ristić i Suad Mrkonjić	not awarded
1967.	Rajmond Bertan; Ibro Brkić; Vladimir Dedijer; Ahmed Grebo; Zdenko Grgić; Juraj Marek; Antun Marinić; Adi Mulabegović; Mithat Mutapčić; Makso Savin; Radivoje Spasić; Asim Šukalić; Duško Trifunović; Rasim Volić; Anđelko Vuletić	Vahidin Spahović i Mijo Trgovčević	not awarded
1968.	Sadik Bučuk; Izet Buševac; Dragica Čalić; Bahrudin Čengić; Blagoje Đorđević; Slobodan Jovičić; Hajrija Kapić; Nikola Nikolajević; Nenad Radanović; Hazim Šabanović	Dragan Ivošević i Olga Saničanin	Gorska služba spašavanja – Stanica Sarajevo
1969.	Mersad Berber; Sead Brkić; Abaz Deronja; Sofija Divčić; Vefik Hadžismajlović; Ejub Ibrahimović; Hamdija Kapidžić; Svetozar Koljević; Herta Kuna; Rikard Kuzmić; Ibrahim Ljubović; Slavko Mićanović; Tihomir Mirić; Danica Rošulj-Malkin	Petar Razlog, Šemso Hadžiefendić, Salko Selimović i Murat Goro	not awarded

=== 1970s ===
Godina	Individual award	Group award	Collective award
1970.	Borislav Aleksić; Risto Besarović; Slavko Čanković; Muhamed Filipović; Bogdan Maksimović; Sulejman Memić; Ognjen Miličević; Ljubica Mladenović; Hilmija Pitić; Danilo Protić; Slavko Šantić; Aleksa Štrbo; Rifat Tvrtković	– Živorad Janković, Ognjeslav Malkin i Halid Muhasilović – Ismet Mehić i Ranko Stanišić	Sarajevo Ballet
1971.	Olga Đoković; Darinka Đurašković; Leopold Kauret; Veljko Kojović; Boško Kučanski; Alija Kučukalić; Vojslav Maksimović; Enver Mehmedbašić; Mira Meštrović; Muhamed Muratbegović; Vojislav Pavlović; Slavko Pervan; Kasim Prohić; Arif Purivatra; Dara Sekulić; Hamdija Sijerčić; Svetozar Zimonjić	Vladimir Knor, Slavko Bilobrk i Abdulah Jesenković	not awarded
1972.	Pavle Dostal; Savo Đurić; Vojin Komadina; Marko Krsmanović; Zdenko Lešić; Nikola Nešković; Zdravko Ostojić; Hiba Ramadanović; Džemal Rezaković; Abdulah Šarčević; Bakir Tanović; Mehmed Zaimović; Miodrag Žalica	not awarded	Sarajevo National Theatre
1973.	Ivan Foht; Pavle Fukerak; Branko Kurpjel; Svetislav Masleša; Stjepan Matić; Abdulah Olovčić; Radovan Vučković; Ivan Zovko	Emina Kamberović-Mičić i Muhamed Imanić	„"Vaso Miskin Crni" Sarajevu
1974.	Milica Buljubašić; Hašim Čaušević; Vladimir Dobrović; Ivan Kalcina; Jelka Knežević; Nikola Kovač; Dušan Maleš; Lazo Materić; Mihajlo Mihaljević; Muhamed Sandžaktarević; Ešref Sarajlić; Dževad Softić	not awarded	"Ivan Goran Kovačić" Elementary School
1975.	Stevo Anđelić; Fehim Avdić; Azra Begić; Franc Cingle; Nedžad Ibrišimović; Josip Katalinski; Borivoje Knežević; Katarina Kocka; Tvrtko Kulenović; Ramo Lončarević; Jagoda Maksimović-Beran; Ljubo Miloš; Muhamed Mujezinović; Fadil Numić; Josip Pejaković; Božo Raković; Ruža Starčević; Neđo Šipovac; Alija Talić; Meho Vladović	Milan Kušan, Branko Bulić, Svetozar Gogunović i Franjo Lastavec	– Prosvjetno-pedagoški zavod – Fabrika duhana u Sarajevu – Kamerni teatar 55 – Tvornica čarapa "Ključ" – Steleks – Sarajevofilm – Škola za unutrašnje poslove u Sarajevu – SOUR Unioninvest – RO Vodovod i kanalizacija Sarajevo
1976.	Zdravko Besarović; Mirza Delibašić; Hasan Hadžiomerović; Alija Isaković; Mustafa Karišik; Savan Knežević; Kolobarić; Mladen Uroš Kravljača; Zdravko Likić; Gertruda Munitić; Mithat Prcić; Nevenka Pucar; Belkisa Rizvanbegović; Halid Sinanović; Dušan Spasojević; Branko Tomašević	not awarded	– NIŠRO Oslobođenje – Osnovna škola "29. novembar" – RKUD "Proleter" – Institut za transfuziologiju i hematologiju Bosne i Hercegovine – OKUD "Ivo Lola Ribar" – Biblioteka "Logos" – OOUR Livnica čelika – SOUR Energoinvest – Mjesna zajednica Ilidža – Savez gorana grada Sarajeva – Studijski centar Gradskog komiteta Saveza komunista Sarajevo
1977.	Midhat Aganović; Boro Drašković; Radoslav Džodžo; Muris Idrizović; Vladimir Jokanović; Ekrem Kulenović; Zlatko Lavanić; Mirko Lukić; Radovan Milan; Miroslav Miličević; Muzafer Mujić; Mirko Ovadija; Dušan Piljo; Rizo Selmanagić; Alma Sokolović; Tonko Šoljan; Alojz Vesić	not awarded	– Akademsko astronomsko društvo Sarajevo – Revija Odjek – Profesionalna vatrogasna brigada Sarajevo – Institut za automatiku i računske nauke IRCA – Mjesna zajednica Blagovac – Radio program Sarajevo 202
1978.	Mitar Aleksić; Novak Anđelić; Ljubomir Berberović; Razija Handžić; Mirza Idrizović; Hanifa Kapidžić-Osmanagić; Ljubo Kojo; Ratko Lalić; Tonko Marčić; Jasenka Roter-Petrović; Muhamed Teftedarija; Čedomir Vujanović	Ante Rajić, Džemaludin Karić i Vinko Rajić	– KK Bosna Royal – Indeksi – MZ Bistrik – OKUD "Miljenko Cvitković" –Omer Paša Latas production by the National Theatre – Prva gimnazija u Sarajevu
1979.	Dragan Anđelić; Milo Gučevac; Zaim Imamović; Aleksandar Kalmar; Nasiha Kapidžić-Hadžić; Nedžad Kolaković; Manojlo Marković; Ismar Mujezinović; Ismet Mujezinović; Vladimir Pšorn; Zijah Sokolović; Derviš Sušić; Stipo Vilić; Tihomir Vuković	Vokalni ansambl "Prijatelji"	– Hotel Evropa – Konferencija Osnovne organizacije saveza slijepih BiH Sarajevo – Streljačka družina "Mile Vujović Učo" – UPI RO Proizvodnja i prerada mlijeka – Savezna omladinska radna akcija "Sarajevo" – RK Željezničar – Škola za osnovno muzičko obrazovanje "Dr. Vojislav Vučković" – Tkaonica ćilima Ilidža – Vojni orkestar Sarajevo

=== 1980s ===
Godina	Individual award	Group award	Collective awards
1980.	Fahrija Ajanović; Mustafa Ajanović; Vladimir Bjelica; Nikola Cvijetić; Jovanka Čović; Karlo Dombaj; Rato Dugonjić; Zoran Gajić; Fuad Hadžihalilović; Miroslav Jančić; Radoslav Jovanović; Dragutin Kosovac; Svetislav Lučić; Olga Marasović; Munir Mesihović; Branko Mikulić; Džemal Muminagić; Mehmed Metevelić; Dane Olbina; Muzafer Osmanagić; Avdo Smajlović; Žarko Varajić	not awarded	– OOUR Elektrotopionica RO Željezara Ilijaš – SOUR Famos – Feroelektro – OŠ "Bane Šurbat" – UPI RO Promet na malo – Građevinska radna organizacija Put – Sarajevska brigada Teritorijalne odbrane Hasan Brkić
1981.	Bahra Đuk; Mladen Knežević; Moni Levi; Julio Marić; Mara Marinković; Mirko Marjanović; Borislav Milatović; Kemal Monteno; Muhamed Nakaš; Mirko Oljača; Vaso Radić; Milanko Renovica; Safet Sušić; Milivoje Unković; Zvonko Zrnčić	Fatih Imamović, Zdravko Jurić, Željko Molinar i Zijo Pašić	– Stanica policije za bezbjednost saobraćaja Sarajevo – OKUD "Slobodan Princip Seljo"
1982.	Nađija Biser-Taso; Milan Gračanin; Seid Hasanefendić; Milan Hiholjčić; Ratko Jovičić; Zijo Kučukalić; Emir Kusturica; Anton Lovrinčević; Vesna Mašić; Aleksa Mikić; Sofija Mikšić; Franjo Milošević; Danilo Štaka; Miroslav Varadin	– Nazim Alihodžić, Mehmedalija Budalica, Miodrag Popadić, Enver Raljević i Mirko Šošić –Vokalni ansambl "Breze"	– Umjetnički paviljon Colegium aristicum – RO Petrolinvest –Emisija Televizije Sarajevo Sarajevska hronika
1983.	Predrag Bojić; Katarina Dorić; Mihailo Galić; Janez Gorišek; Nenad Guzina; Asim Jamakosmanović; Aleksandar Jevđević; Borivoje Knežević; Salim Obralić; Muhamed Pašović; Petar Skert; Milica Šnajder-Huterer; Ismet Zubović	– Nisim Albahari, Rafael Brčić, Miodrag Čanković, Mehmed Džinić, Ahmed Hadžirović i Dane Olbina –Natalija Dozet, Marko Stanišić i Sonja Sumenić-Bijeljac	– Hemijski institut Prirodno-matematičkog fakulteta Sarajevo – Radio kub "Nikola Tesla" – Sarajevo Philharmonic Orchestra – SOUR Energoinvest RO "Vaso Miskin Crni" – Vojna bolnica Sarajevo
1984.	Boris Bakrač; Stevan Bulajić; Ahmed Karabegović; Kemal Karačić; Sofija Kosovac; Nedžad Kurto; Razija Lagumdžija; Pavle Lukač; Seid Maglajlica; Milan Medić; Mirko Mladić; Milan Mučibabić; Murat Musabegović; Sadudin Musabegović; Kira Memić; Salko Oruč; Isak Ozmo; Vanja Popović; Hranislav Rašić; Sabahudin Selesković; Anto Sučić; Artur Takač; Vojo Tomić; Alija Velić; Ljubiša Zečević	not awarded	– Klinika za rekonstruktivnu i plastičnu hirurgiju – Organizacioni komitet XIV ZOI – Organi unutrašnjih poslova opština i grada Sarajeva – Radio-televizija Sarajevo – GRO "Vranica" – Dom kulture Vratnik – RO "Zrak" Sarajevo´ – Oslobođenje
1985.	Ljubo Aralica; Mahmut Bajraktarević; Muhidin Begić; Franjo Budim; Oskar Danon; Musa Dizdarević; Jelena Dopudža; Ahmed Džuvić; Miloš Đurašković; Aleksandar Fajgelj; Leon Fliker; Kazimir Franković; Miroslav Homen; Mujesira Ivić; Rasim Hukara; Dragan Jakmirović; Dževad Jarebica; Džemil Kapetanović; Zagorka Kapetanović; Slobodan Kezunović; Faruk Konjhodžić; Desa Koštan-Olbina; Slavica Kujundžić; Hakija Kulenović; Sidika Lokmić; Nedim Mahić; Dane Maljković; Zdravko Marić; Spasoje Mičić; Rajka Mikulić; Mitar Minić; Ante Nevjestić; Ankica Pavlović-Albahari; Mile Perković; Ratko Popadić; Fuad Ramić; Veljko Ržehak; Ervin-Stanko Salcberger; Mehmed Šišić; Arif Tanović; Sekula Todorović; Mirko Tošić; Salko Vilić	not awarded	– Institut za fizijatriju i rehabilitaciju Ilidža – Industrija pekarstva Sarajevo – Gimnazija "Ognjen Prica" – Pozorište mladih Sarajevo – Šahovski klub "Sarajevo" – RO "Vladimir Perić Valter" Sarajevo

=== 1990s ===
Godina	Individual award	Group award	Collective award
1990.	Rifat Hadžiselimović; Ademir Kenović; Hasan Muratović; Predrag Nikolić; Ivica Osim; Aleksandra Romanić; Salih Sadović	not awarded	–DP „Energoinvest" – Računarski centar Sarajevo – Zavod za specijalno vaspitanje i obrazovanje djece u Sarajevu
1993–97.	not awarded		

=== 2000s ===
Godina	Individual award nagrada	Group award	Collective award
2001	Gojko Berić		
2005	Senad Hadžifejzović		

=== 2010s ===
Godina	Individual award	Group award	Collective award
2010.	Ibrahim Spahić	Larisa Cerić, Arijana Jaha i Branimir Crnogorac	Opća bolnica "Prim. dr. Abdulah Nakaš"
2011.	Dejan Milošević	Zilha Šeta, Bahra Radača, Selma Kadrić i Fahra Tatlić	Hrvatsko narodno vijeće Bosne i Hercegovine
2012.	Valerijan Žujo	not awarded	Udruženje likovnih umjetnika Bosne i Hercegovine
2013.	Edin Džeko	not awarded	SOS Children's Village
2014.	Nada Đurevska	architects Ferhad Mulabegović i Smajo Mulaomerović	Bosnia and Herzegovina national football team
2015.	Safet Zec	Jim Marshall i Timothy – Tim Clancy	Association of parents of killed children in Sarajevo 1992.-1995.
2016.	Mirsad Fazlagić; Jovan Divjak; Hadžan Konjo; Milomir Kovačević Strašni		
