= Branko Grković =

Branko Grković (19 February 1920 – 8 April 1982) was a Bosnian-Herzegovinian composer, arranger, music editor, music critic, pianist, music educator, and writer on music.

== Life and career ==
Branko Grković was born on 19 February 1920 in Mostar. He was educated at the Sarajevo Music Academy and the Belgrade Music Academy (now the University of Arts in Belgrade). Some of his teachers included Kosta Manojlović, Josip Štolcer-Slavenski. He also studied at the Vienna Music Academy with Joseph Marx.

After World War II Grković was employed by the Unified League of Anti-Fascist Youth of Yugoslavia in Belgrade before moving back to Sarajevo where he worked as a music editor for Radio Sarajevo. He also taught voice and piano at the Prva gimnazija,Sarajevo from 1947 until his death in 1982, and in those same years was the longtime staff piano accompanist at the Sarajevo National Theatre. He was also a concert pianist, and wrote music criticism and academic papers on music.

In 1957 Grković was the recipient of the Sixth of April Sarajevo Award. His compositions were mostly instrumental music, and consisted of chamber music, orchestral music, and works for solo piano. In addition to writing traditional music forms like concerti and sonatas, he also wrote film scores and music for the theatre and ballet. He music embraced neoclassicism and rarely incorporated elements of musical modernism.

Grković died in Sarajevo on 8 April 1982 at the age of 62.
