= Muzafer Mujić =

Bosnian physiologist (born 1931)

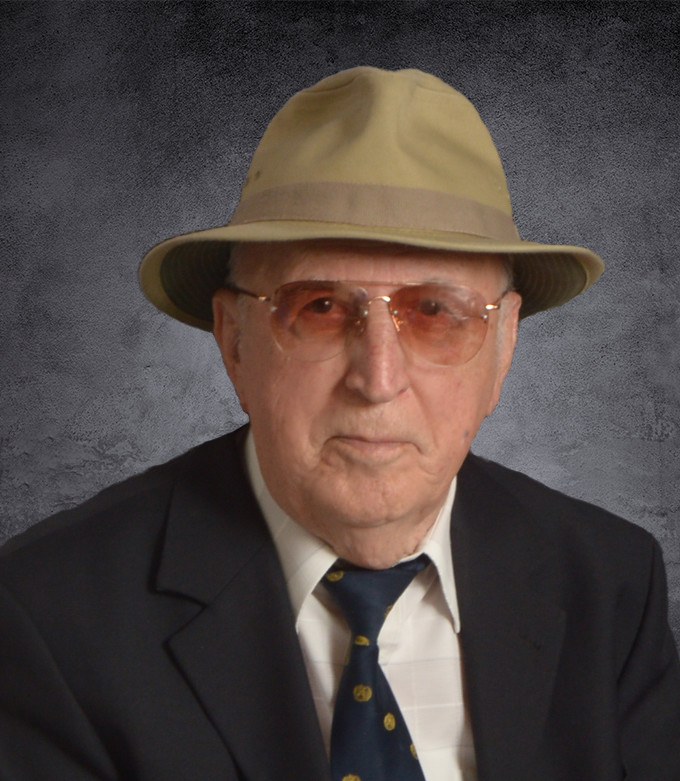
- Born: 14 June 1931 (age 95); Sarajevo, Drina Banovina, Kingdom of Yugoslavia
- Education: University of Sarajevo
- Known for: classification of sympathomimetic drugs, comparative pharmacodynamics of imidazolines, Editor-in-chief of Bosnian Journal of Basic Medical Sciences
- Scientific career
- Fields: Physiology; Biochemistry
- Workplaces: University of Sarajevo Medical Faculty

Muzafer Mujić (born 14 June 1931) is a Bosnian physiologist known for his contributions to classification of sympathomimetic drugs and comparative pharmacodynamics of imidazolines. He is professor emeritus at the University of Sarajevo and Editor-in-chief of Bosnian Journal of Basic Medical Sciences.

== Early life and education ==
Mujić graduated in 1960 from the University of Sarajevo Medical Faculty. After a short period of clinical internship and clinical practice, he started an academic career at his home university, at the Institute for Physiology and Biochemistry, where he obtained his PhD (1972), and professorship (1978).

== Career ==
His early research interests included basic research in classification of sympathomimetic drugs and comparative pharmacodynamics of imidazolines. During his career Mujić held important academic positions, including Vice Dean of Pharmaceutical Faculty of the University of Sarajevo (1980–1984) and Head of the Institute for Physiology and Biochemistry, Medical Faculty of the University of Sarajevo (1993–1998). He was one of the founders of the Association of Basic Medical Sciences of Bosnia and Herzegovina, and the Bosnian Journal of Basic Medical Sciences, where he is active Editor-in-chief for many years.

== Awards and honors ==
Sixth April Award of Sarajevo, 1977

University of Sarajevo Medical Faculty Plaque, 2016
