= Škrinjar =

Škrinjar is a Croatian surname derived from the noun škrinja meaning Chest (furniture). Notable people with the surname include:

- Franjo Škrinjar (1920–1989), Yugoslav long-distance runner
- Valerija Skrinjar Tvrz (1928–2023), Slovene Partisan codebreaker, journalist, writer and translator
- Vjekoslav Škrinjar (born 1969), Croatian football player

== See also ==
- Milan Škriniar, a Slovak football player
