= Face TV =

Face TV may refer to:

- Face TV (Bosnia and Herzegovina)
- Face TV (New Zealand)
