= Ajanović =

Ajanović is a surname. Notable people with the surname include:

- Mustafa Ajanović (born 1927), Yugoslav doctor
- Midhat Ajanović (born 1959), Bosnian-Swedish film theorist
- Sanja Ajanović Hovnik (born 1977), Slovenian politician
- Ines Ajanović (born 1980), Serbian basketball player
