= Sveti Urh =

Sveti Urh may refer to several places in Slovenia:

- Ravenska Vas, a settlement in the Municipality of Zagorje ob Savi, known as Sveti Urh until 1955
- Urh, Slovenska Bistrica, a settlement in the Municipality of Slovenska Bistrica, known as Sveti Urh until 1952
