= Ravenska Vas =

Ravenska Vas Sveti Urh (until 1955)
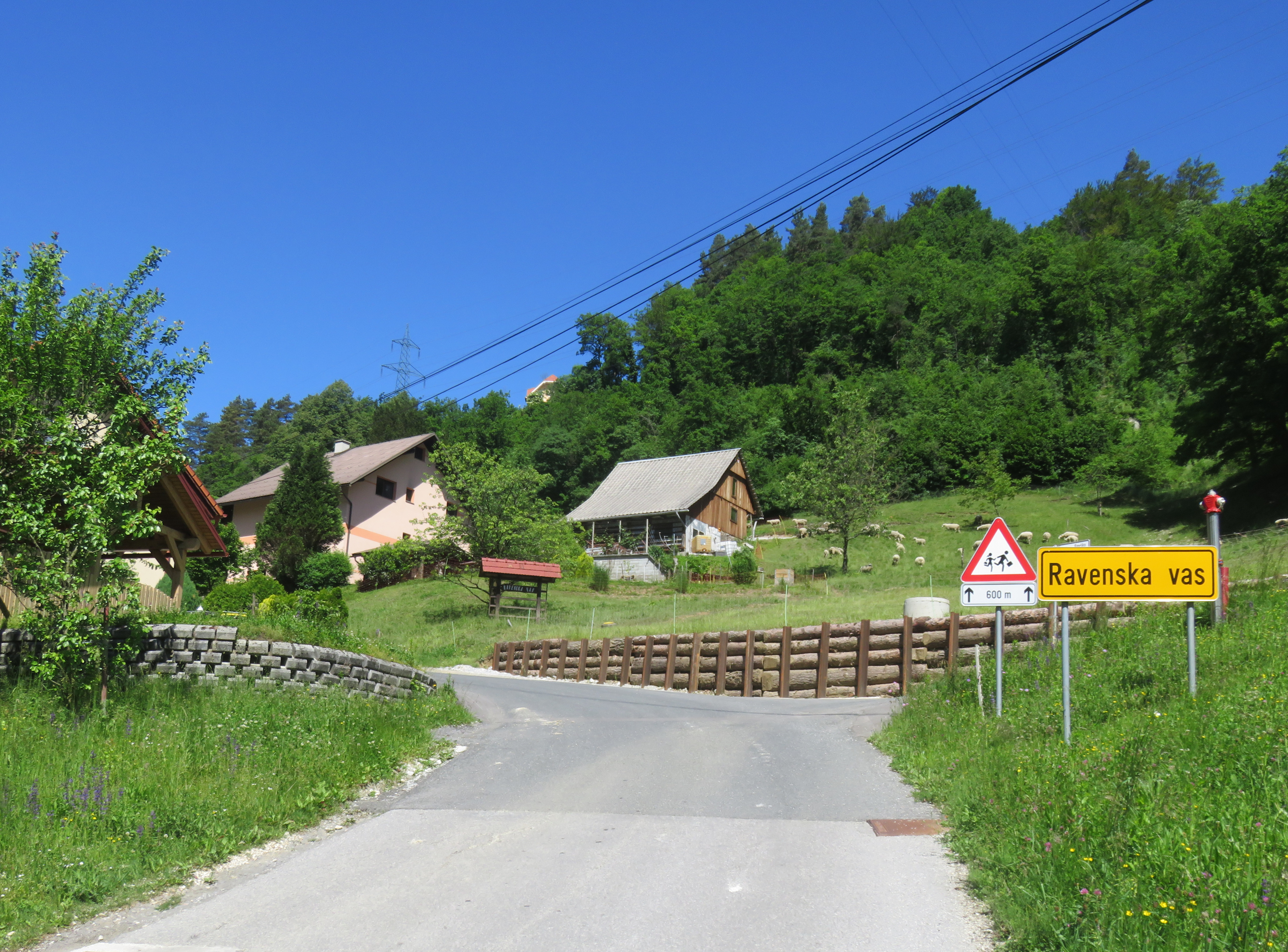

- Location in Slovenia
- Coordinates: 46°8′2.94″N 15°1′8.49″E
- Country: Slovenia
- Traditional region: Upper Carniola
- Statistical region: Central Sava
- Municipality: Zagorje ob Savi

Area
  - Total: 4.41 km^{2} (1.70 sq mi)
- Elevation: 423.9 m (1,391 ft)

Population (2002)
  - Total: 214
- Postal code: 1410

Ravenska Vas (pronounced [ɾaˈʋeːnska ˈʋaːs] or [ˈɾaːʋɛnska ˈʋaːs]; Slovene: Ravenska vas, formerly Sveti Urh, German: Sankt Ulrich) is a settlement immediately east and southeast of Zagorje ob Savi in central Slovenia. The area is part of the traditional region of Upper Carniola. It is now included with the rest of the municipality in the Central Sava Statistical Region.

== Name ==
The name of the settlement was changed from Sveti Urh (literally, 'Saint Ulrich') to Ravenska vas (literally, 'level village') in 1955. The name was changed on the basis of the 1948 Law on Names of Settlements and Designations of Squares, Streets, and Buildings as part of efforts by Slovenia's postwar communist government to remove religious elements from toponyms.

== Mass graves ==
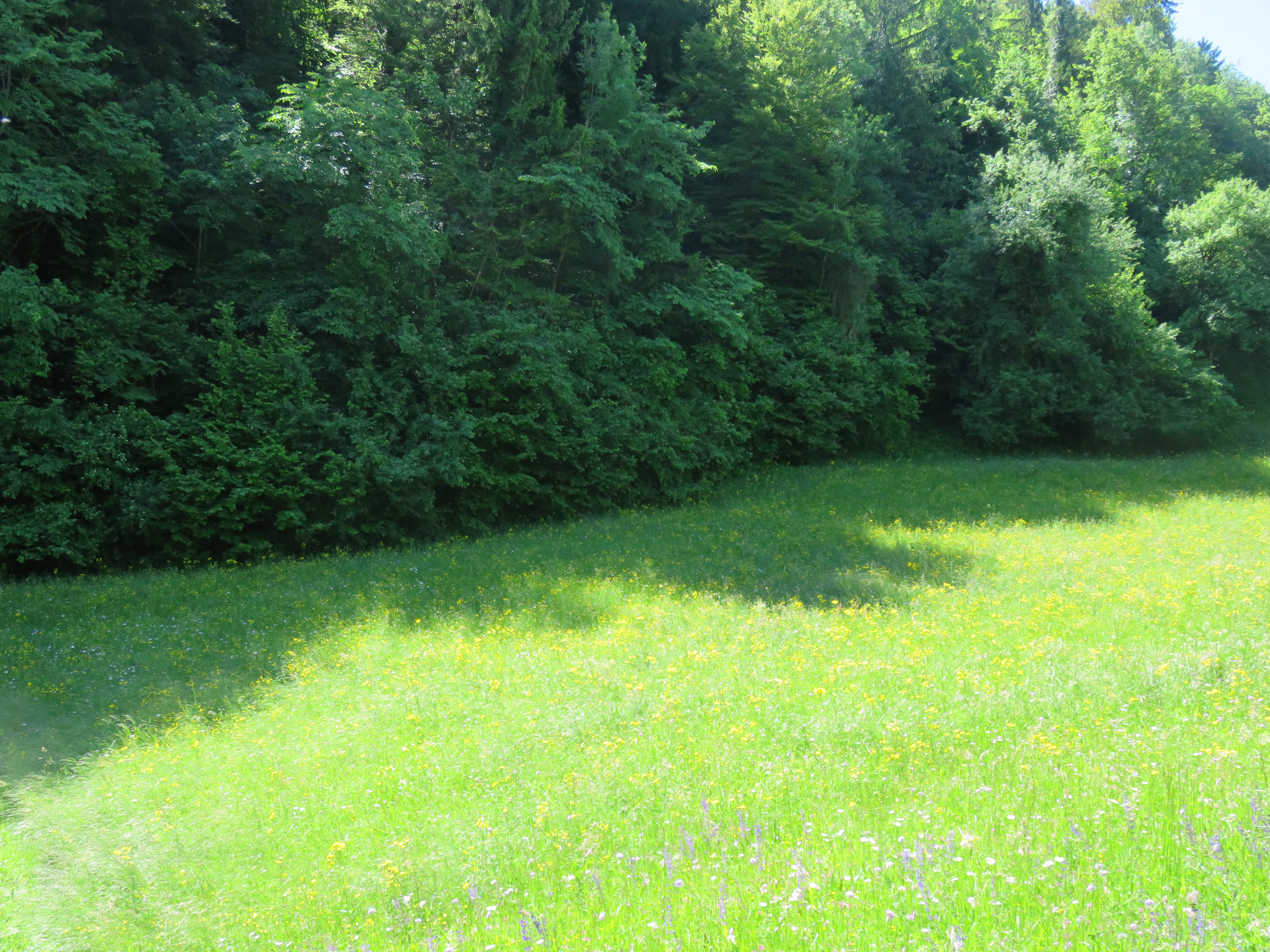
Site of the Ravenska Vas 1–3 Mass Graves

Ravenska Vas is the site of five known mass graves associated with the Second World War. They all contain the remains of unidentified victims. The Snežet Mass Grave (Slovene: Grobišče Snežet) is located in the woods 500 meters (1,600 ft) south of the house at Ravenska Vas no. 38. The Birch Mass Grave (Grobišče Pod brezo) is located in the woods 300 meters (980 ft) east of the house at Ravenska Vas no. 39. The Ravenska Vas 1–3 mass graves (Grobišče Ravenska vas 1–3) are located in a meadow on the edge of the woods.

== Church ==
The local church is dedicated to Saint Ulrich (Slovene: sveti Urh) and belongs to the Parish of Zagorje ob Savi. It dates to the late 16th century and was restyled in the Baroque in the late 18th century.
