= Milan Mučibabić =

Milan Mučibabić (1922 – 1985) was an author and journalist born in Nevesinje, Bosnia and Herzegovina. After graduating from the construction engineering high school, he got a job in steel works in Zenica. In 1941, at the start of World War II, he joined the army as a partisan and participated in defending his country. After the war, he worked as a youth activist and later as a journalist for "Oslobodjenje", where he stayed until his early retirement in 1969 after which he devoted himself to his literary work. As a journalist, he wrote reports about local villages, agriculture, and various pieces about people and happenings during and after the war. He is a recipient of numerous journalistic and literary awards, including the Sixth of April Award which he received for his literary works. He published a number of books, the most notable of which was the trilogy "Stone and ashes" for which he received recognition as the best novel with a war theme. He died in 1985 in Sarajevo where he is also buried.

== Bibliography ==
- From the other side of the trenches (1958)
- Landmarks (1964)
- The story about our youth (1967)
- The stone sea (1970)
- Bezdanica (1973)
- Romanija which lives (1974)
- The blooming colors of summer (1975)
- Undefeated by time (1978)
- Stone and ashes I and II (1982)
- When children did not play war (1984)
- Stone and ashes III (1984)
- At the end of dark deep woods (1990)
