= Senad Hadžifejzović =

Bosnian journalist (born 1962)

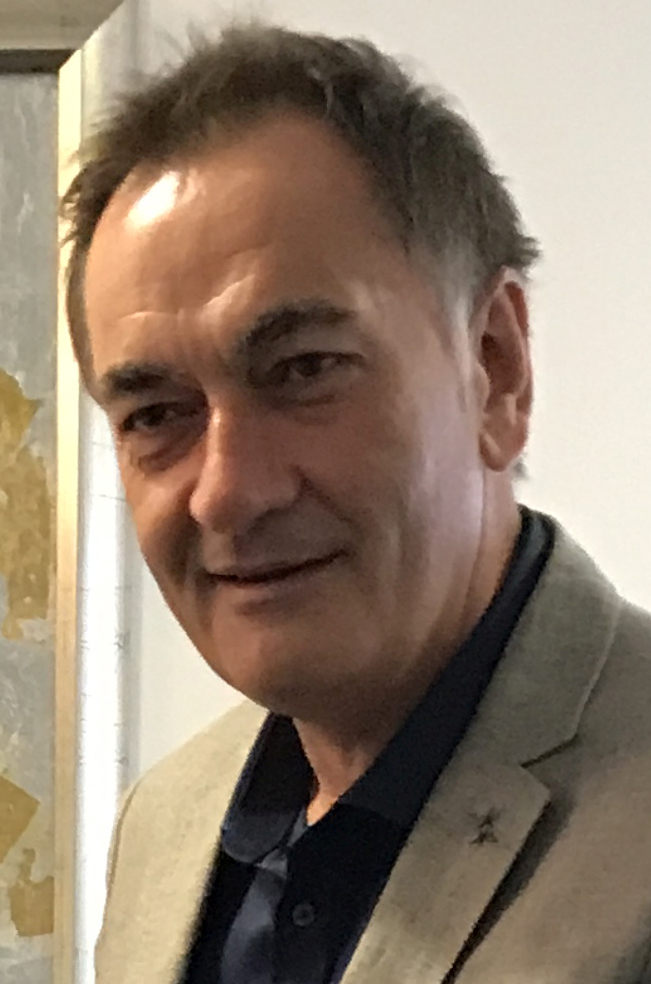
- Hadžifejzović in 2017
- Born: 15 May 1962 (age 63); Sjenica, PR Serbia, FPR Yugoslavia
- Education: Faculty of Political Sciences, University of Belgrade; University of Sarajevo; FAMU Academy
- Occupations: Journalist, presenter
- Years active: 1974–present
- Employers: Radio Sarajevo; TVSA; RTV BiH; Face TV (owner)
- Children: 3

Senad Hadžifejzović (born 15 May 1962) is a Bosnian journalist, news anchor and TV host. He is best known for founding and running Face TV.

Hadžifejzović is one of the most popular and notable journalists and television hosts both in Bosnia and Herzegovina and in the former Yugoslavia. He is a recipient of many awards and accolades, including the Sixth of April Sarajevo Award and the International League of Humanists Award.

== Early life and education ==
Born in Sjenica, PR Serbia, FPR Yugoslavia on 15 May 1962, Hadžifejzović is of Turkish descent; according to him, the founder of the Hadžifejzović family was an Arab who worked as an officer in the Turkish army and who married a Turkish woman.

Hadžifejzović's first text was published in a newspaper in 1974: Belgrade's Borba published a text by 12-year-old Hadžifejzović as the best journalistic work by a young author. From 1978 to 1984 he worked for Borba (Belgrade), Omladinske novine (NON Belgrade), Radio Index 202 (Belgrade), Radio Sarajevo 202 and Večernje novine (Sarajevo). During this period, he published more than 800 texts, articles, reports and comments in newspapers. He was a reporter, presenter and editor on several radio stations. From 1981 to 1984, he studied journalism at the Faculty of Political Sciences and the University of Sarajevo. He graduated in Sarajevo in 1984 and was the youngest graduate of the faculty.

== Career ==
Hadžifejzović signed his first professional contract in 1985 for Radio Sarajevo and in the same year became the youngest editor of it. He was the editor of the Joint Program of Radio Stations of SR Bosnia and Herzegovina. He edited and coordinated the program of 52 local stations in Bosnia and Herzegovina, as well as the joint news program Susret na talasu. In 1987, Hadžifejzović started and edited the Youth Program, the largest media project in Yugoslavia. He edited the project with Boro Kontić. The youth program was listened daily by 800,000 young people throughout Yugoslavia.

The following year he specialized in television and documentary directing at the FAMU Academy in Prague, Czechoslovakia. From 1988 to 1992, he edited and hosted the show Pet do dvanaest on Televizija Sarajevo.

In 1990, he started, edited and hosted Face to Face, the first television talk show in Yugoslavia. It was broadcast live, favoring a direct discussion with viewers on current topics. It was a pioneering experience of involving viewers in the program without first checking their identity - both for the author and the public.

In 1991, Hadžifejzović was appointed editor and host of Dnevnik, the central news program of Televizija Sarajevo, the youngest editor of Dnevnik in Yugoslavia. At the same time, he worked as the head of DESK, a reporter on key political events in the country (meetings of the presidents of the Yugoslav republics). Hadžifejzović edited Dnevnik until July 2000. In ten years, he edited and ran 1,134 television Dnevniks.

From 1996 to 1998, he edited and hosted a remake of the talk show Face to Face. In 1998, he was appointed Editor-in-Chief and Director of the Television of Bosnia and Herzegovina. In public surveys conducted by the Mareco Index Bosnia agency, Television of Bosnia and Herzegovina had by far the highest ratings in the period from 1998 to 2000. In the same period, the inherited millions of debts of TVBiH were repaid.

In 2000, the new management of RTV BiH decided to remove Hadžifejzović from the position of editor-in-chief and director of Television BiH, explaining that this was done "at the request of Senad Hadžifejzović". He was also removed from the position of the editor of Dnevnik without explanation.

In 2002, he published the book Rat uživo - War: live on air in Bosnian and English. The book is a compilation of all the conversations that the author had in the live program with key actors of the Bosnian War.

In 2003, he was appointed editor of the PBS Cultural and Artistic Program (Public Broadcasting Service).

In the same year, in cooperation with Hayat TV, before the end of the year, Hadžifejzović launched the Centralni dnevnik sa Senadom Hadžifejzovićem (Cd). The CD became one of the most watched news programs in Bosnia and Herzegovina.

In January 2012, he founded Face TV.

== Personal life ==
In January 2021, Hadžifejzović had some health problems, undergoing heart surgery in which stents were built-in his heart.

== Awards ==
Hadžifejzović received the following awards throughout his career:

- TV personality of the year (1991)
- The best journalist in Bosnia and Herzegovina (1993)
- The best TV show in Bosnia and Herzegovina – "Face to face" (1996; 1997)
- The best TV of the year in Bosnia and Herzegovina – TV BiH (1999)
- The best book in the field of journalism in Bosnia and Herzegovina – "Rat uživo - War: live on air" (2003)
- Sixth April Award of Sarajevo (2005)
- International League of Humanists Award – "Humanist of the Year" – Linus Pauling Plaque (2005)
