= Zagorje ob Savi =

- Town
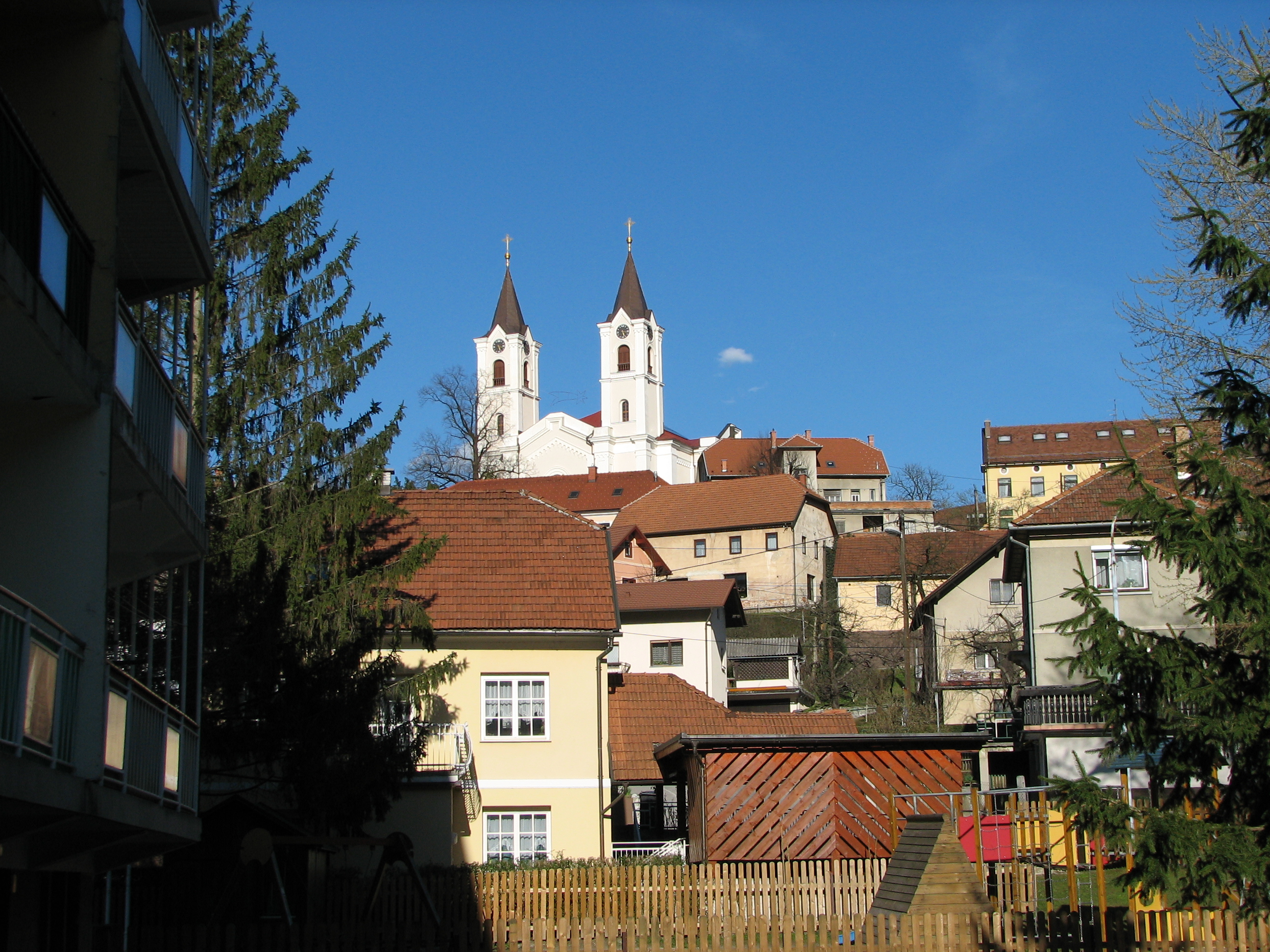
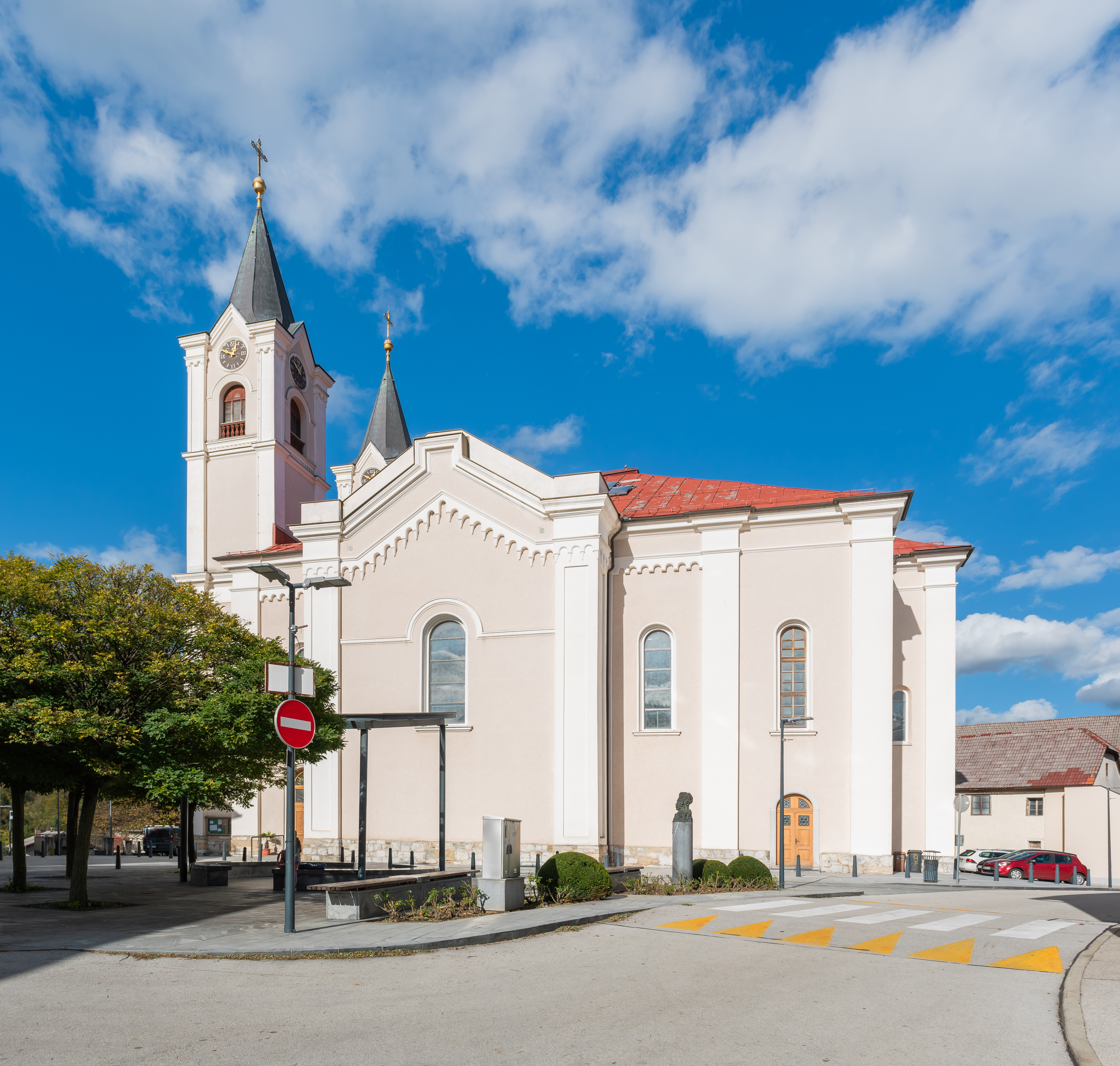
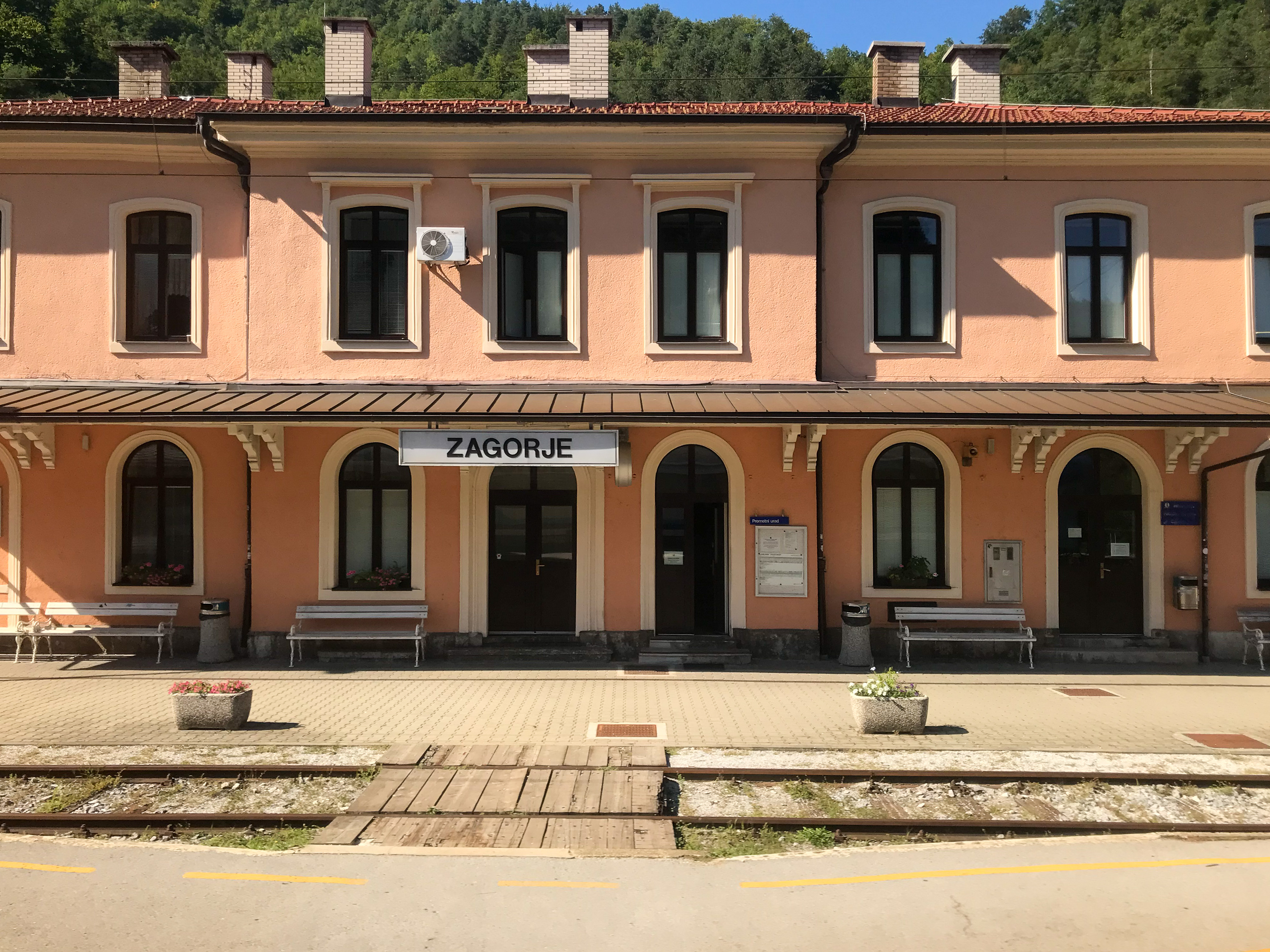
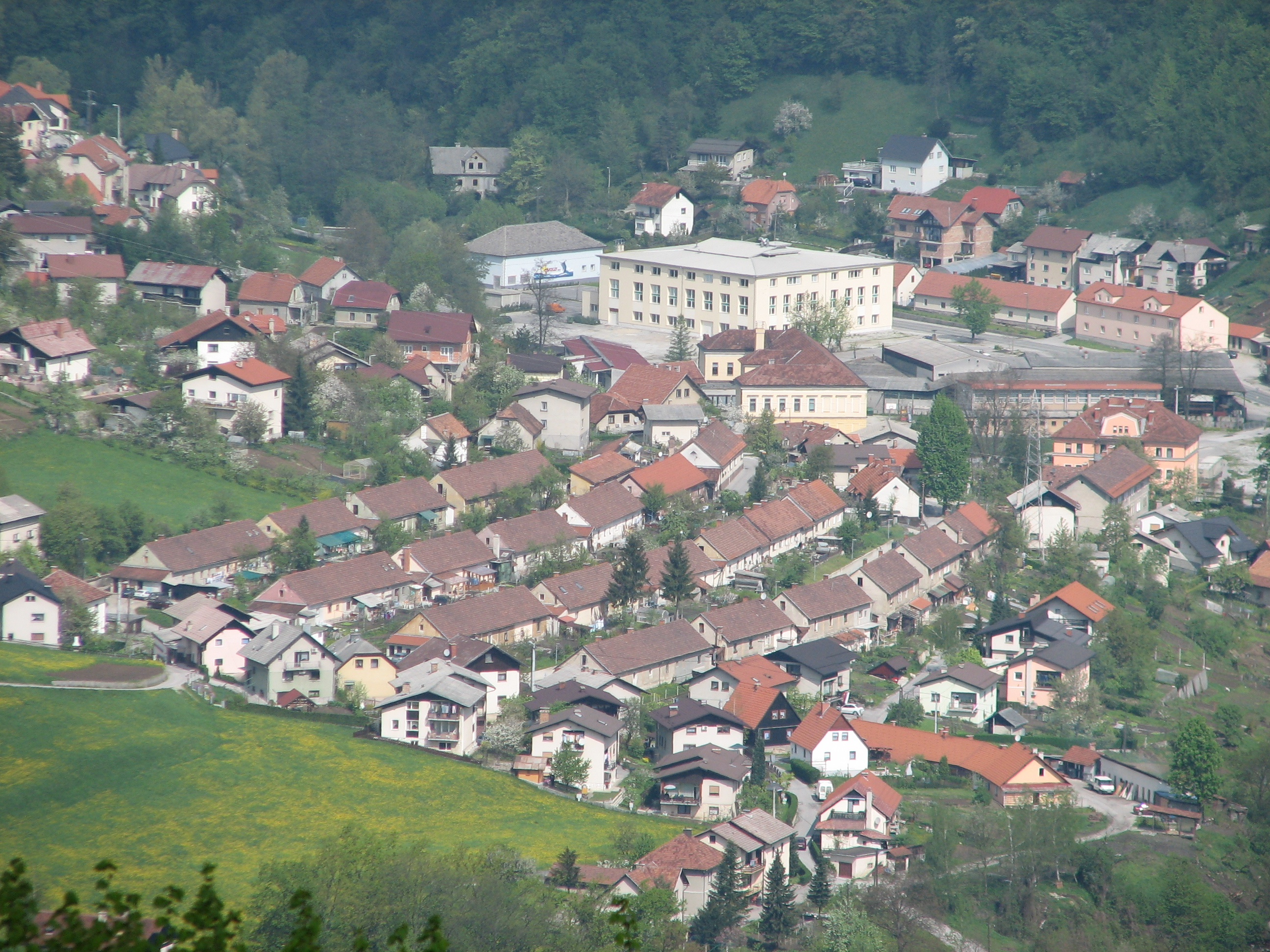
- From top, left to right: View over town, St. Peter and Paul church, Railway Station, Mining Colony

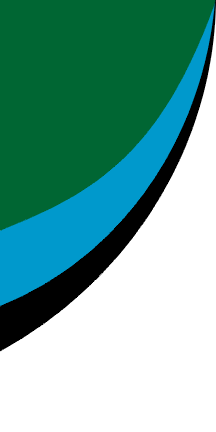
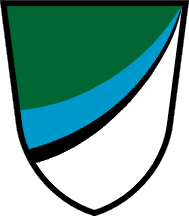
- Flag Coat of arms

- Location in Slovenia
- Coordinates: 46°08′03″N 14°59′39″E
- Country: Slovenia
- Traditional region: Upper Carniola
- Statistical region: Central Sava
- Municipality: Zagorje ob Savi

Area
  - Total: 2.8 km^{2} (1.1 sq mi)
- Elevation: 269.5 m (884 ft)

Population (2002)
  - Total: 6,893
- Postal code: 1410
- Vehicle registration: LJ

Zagorje ob Savi (pronounced [zaˈɡóːɾjɛ ɔp ˈsàːʋi]; German: Sagor, Seger an der Sau) is a town in the Central Sava Valley in central Slovenia. It is the seat of the Municipality of Zagorje ob Savi. It is located in the valley of Medija Creek, a minor left tributary of the Sava River, 52 km (32 mi) east of the capital city Ljubljana, 36 km (22 mi) southwest of Celje, and 6 km (4 mi) west of Trbovlje. The area is part of the traditional region of Upper Carniola. The entire municipality is now included in the Central Sava Statistical Region. The town is home to about 7,000 people. It includes the hamlets of Toplice (German: Töplitz) and Podvine.

== Name ==
Zagorje ob Savi was attested in written sources as Zagorie in 1296, Zagoͤr in 1311, Sager in 1362, Sagor in 1391, and Seger in 1419, among other spellings. The name of the settlement was changed from Zagorje to Zagorje ob Savi in 1955. In the early 20th century the German name was Sagor.

Historical population
Year	Pop.	±%
1948	4,318	—
1953	4,824	+11.7%
1961	6,010	+24.6%
1971	6,738	+12.1%
1981	7,491	+11.2%
1991	7,445	−0.6%
2002	6,893	−7.4%
2011	6,493	−5.8%
2021	6,020	−7.3%
Population size may be affected by changes in administrative divisions.

== History ==
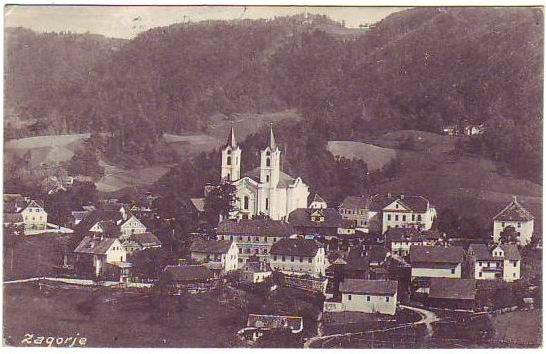
Zagorje in 1927

Archaeological evidence shows that the area was already settled in the Late Bronze Age and Iron Age. In 1755 deposits of coal were discovered in the area and the town's economic development began. Coal mining was one of the area's main activities until 1995, when the last mines were closed. In 2010, Zagorje ob Savi was heavily affected by floods.

== Church ==
The parish church in the settlement is dedicated to Saints Peter and Paul and belongs to the Roman Catholic Archdiocese of Ljubljana. It is a Neo-Romanesque church built in 1873.

== Notable people ==
- Valerija Škrinjar Tvrz
