= Valerija Skrinjar Tvrz =

Slovene writer (1928–2023)

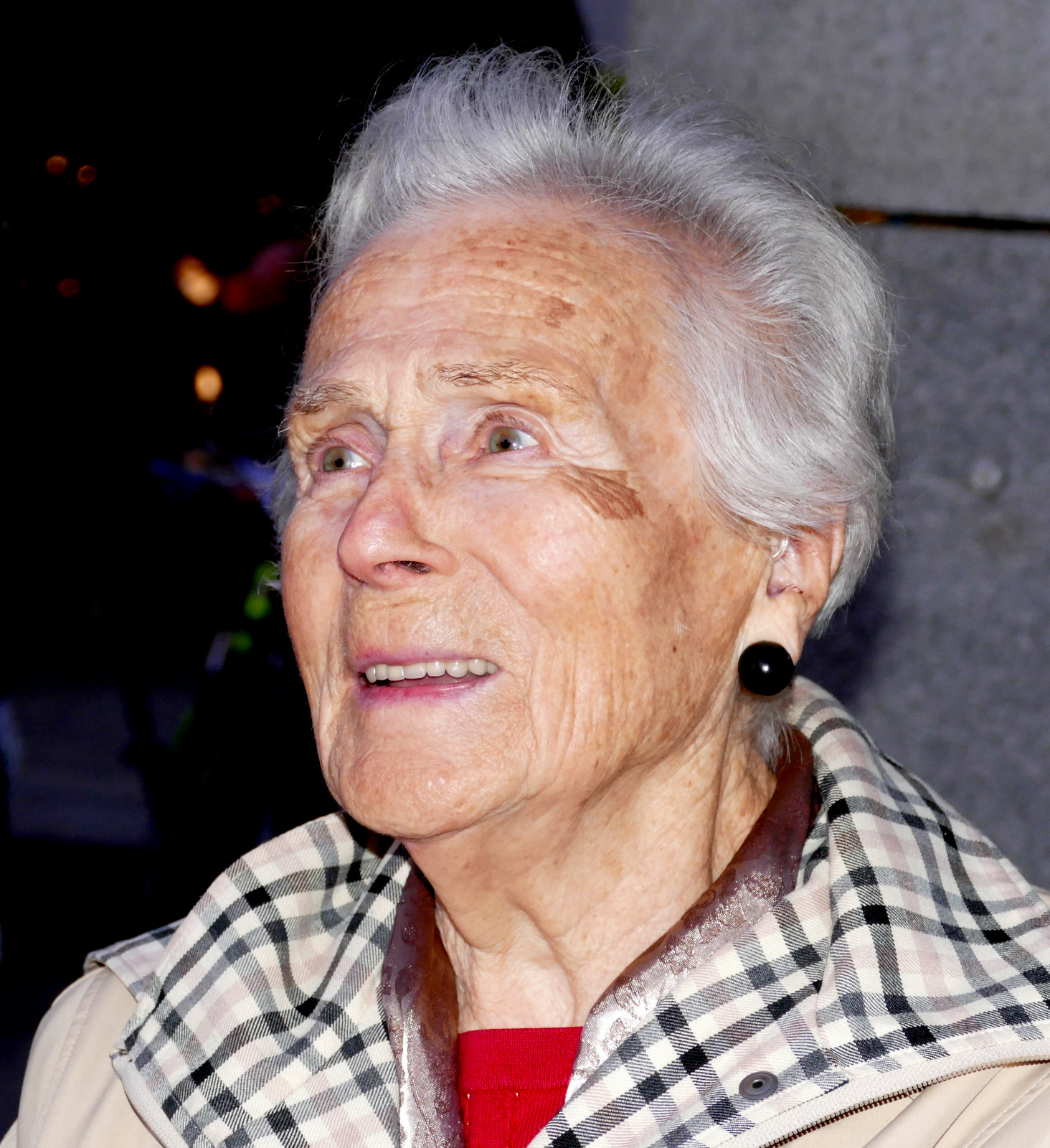
- Born: 8 November 1928; Zagorje ob Savi, Kingdom of Serbs, Croats and Slovenes
- Died: 16 July 2023 (aged 94); Ljubljana, Slovenia
- Other names: Honorču; Valči
- Occupations: Partisan codebreaker, journalist, writer and translator
- Employer: Tanjug
- Organization: Slovene Partisans
- Children: 2
- Awards: Sixth of April Sarajevo Award

Valerija Skrinjar Tvrz (8 November 1928 – 16 July 2023), also known by her illegal pseudonyms Honorču and Valči, was a Slovene partisan codebreaker, journalist, writer and translator.

== Biography ==
Valerija Skrinjar Tvrz was born into a mining family on 8 November 1928 in Zagorje ob Savi, Kingdom of Serbs, Croats and Slovenes.

At the age of 16, Skrinjar joined the Slovene Partisans, part of the anti-Nazi resistance movement led by Yugoslav revolutionary communists during World War II. She worked as a codebreaker in the operational headquarters of the Šlandr and Zidanšek brigades.

After the end of World War II, Skrinjar travelled around the Socialist Federal Republic of Yugoslavia working as a correspondent for the Serbian state-owned news agency Tanjug.

Skrinjar lived in Sarajevo, in the Socialist Republic of Bosnia and Herzegovina federated state within the Socialist Federal Republic of Yugoslavia (now part of Bosnia and Herzegovina), for 40 years. She considered Bosnia her own country. She was the author of the "Dragon's Blood" trilogy of historical novels about Bosnian identity, which cover the medieval period through to World War I and then the Bosnian War (1992–1995). During the war in Bosnia and Herzegovina, Skrinjar fled from Sarajevo to Slovenia with her husband.

Skrinjar was honoured with a Sixth of April Sarajevo Award. She was interviewed about her experiences during World War II for the Radiotelevizija Slovenija documentary series Spomini, broadcast in 2019.

Skrinjar died on 16 July 2023 in Ljubljana, Slovenia, aged 94.

== Legacy ==
Skrinjar was portrayed in the film Breakthrough (2019), directed by Dejan Babosek.
