= Marko Krsmanović =

Serbian painter

- Марко Крсмановић
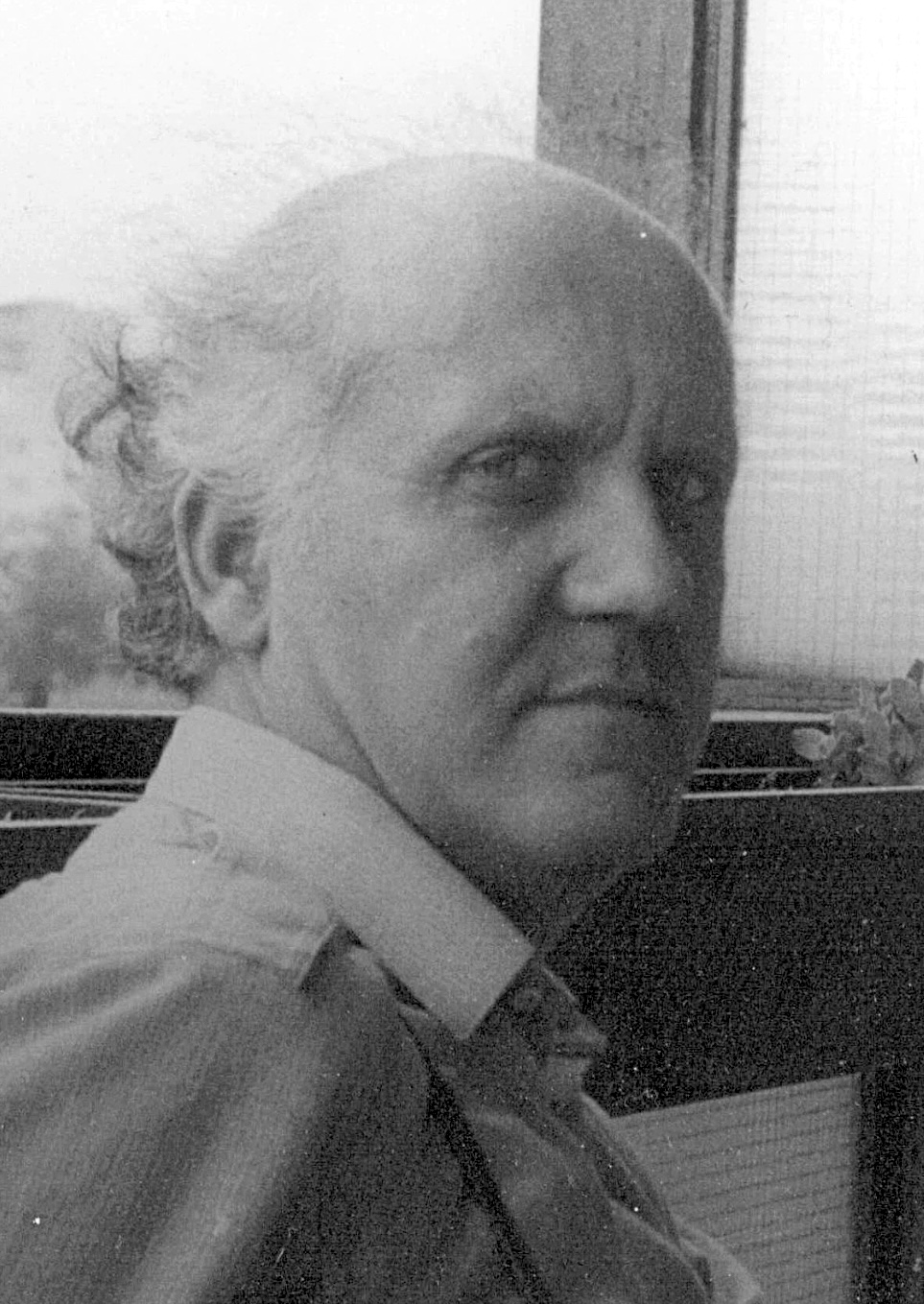
- Born: June 7, 1930; Belgrade, Kingdom of Yugoslavia
- Died: January 12, 1991 (aged 60); Belgrade, SFR Yugoslavia
- Education: University of Arts in Belgrade
- Known for: Painting, Graphic Arts, Art Education

Marko Krsmanović (Serbian Cyrillic: Марко Крсмановић; June 7, 1930 – January 12, 1991) was a Serbian painter, illustrator, printmaker and professor at the Faculty of Fine Arts in Belgrade.

== Early life and education ==
Marko Krsmanović grew up in Belgrade as a son of Dragoljub Krsmanović (1903−1941) and Radinka Radosavljević (1909−1989). Marko's father Dragoljub was killed on 6 April 1941 in the German bombing of Belgrade.

Marko began drawing under the influence of Ivan Tabaković. Back then, during World War II, Marko draw people, portraits and caricatures of relatives and acquaintances, or figures of animals, dogs and chickens.

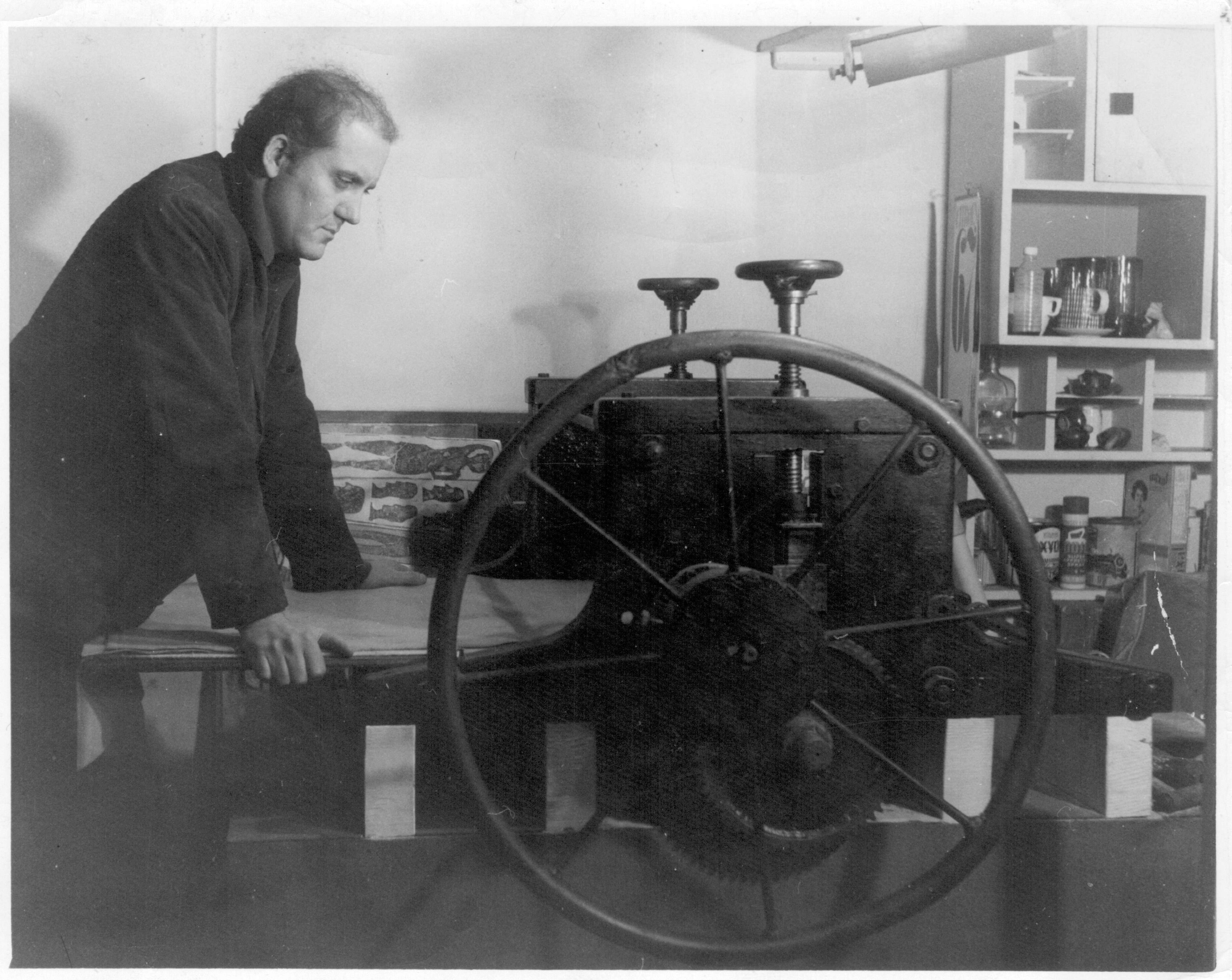
Marko Krsmanović pictured at his atelier in 1970.

In 1949, Krsmanović enrolled at the Faculty of Fine Arts in Belgrade, where he graduated in 1953 in the class of Professor Nedeljko Gvozdenović. From 1953 to 1955, he attended a special course in the class of Professors Marko Čelebonović and Milo Milunović. In the graphics department, under Professor Boško Karanović, he learned the techniques of woodcut, copperplate engraving, and lithography.

== Artistic and pedagogical career ==
Krsmanović has been illustrating children's books since 1944. He illustrated children's books and magazines, such as "Zmaj" (1954) and "Poletarac" (1957).

Krsmanović joined the Graphic Collective in 1954. At his debut exhibition at the Graphic Collective Gallery in 1957, he exhibited drawings and gouaches, and in 1959, color lithographs.

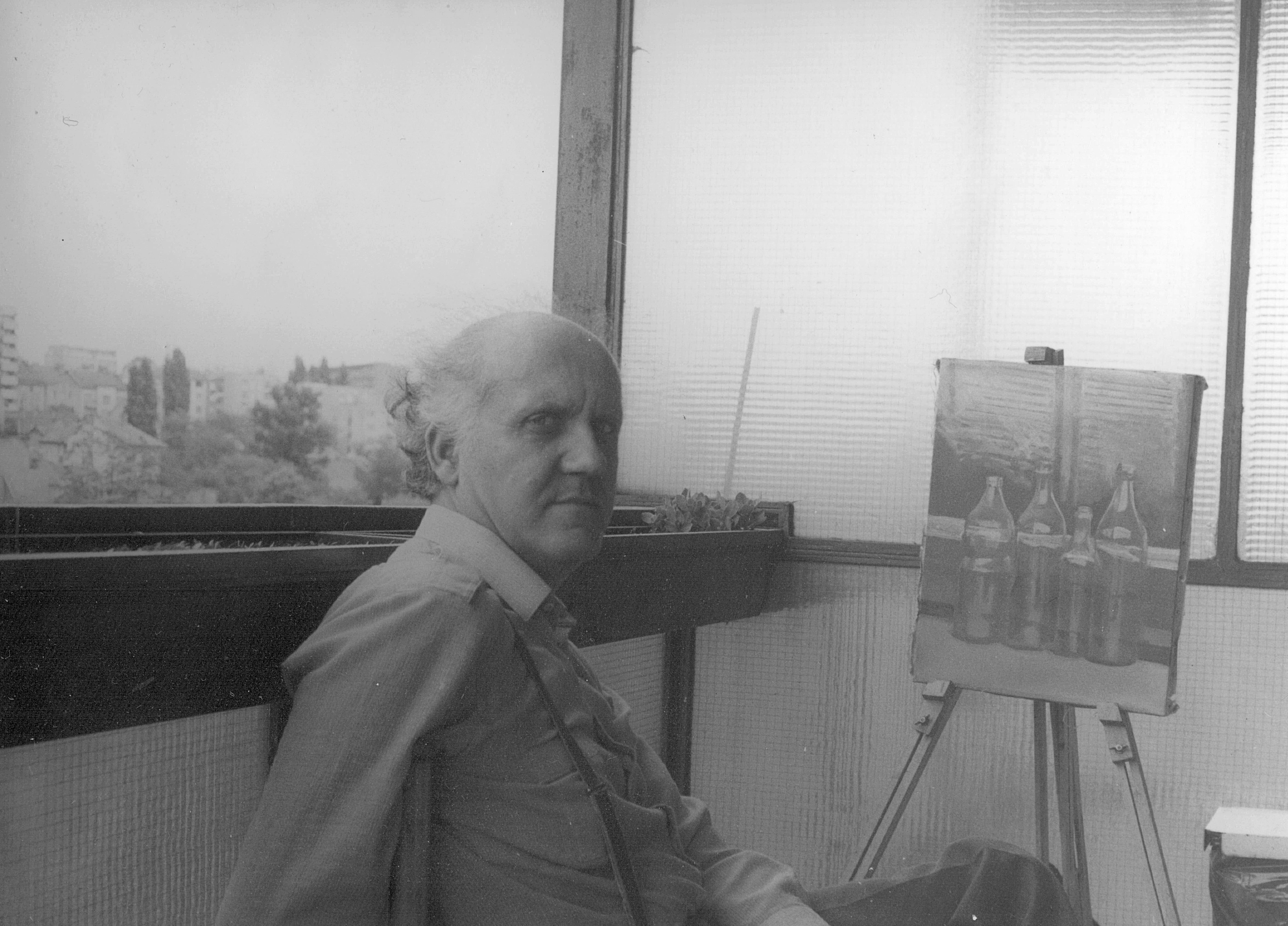
Marko Krsmanović while painting oil on canvas in 1983. in Belgrade.

As a British Council scholarship holder, Krsmanović studied graphic arts at the Central School of Arts and Crafts in London from 1960 to 1961, under Professor Merlin Evans. He stayed in Paris (1963) and Glasgow (1974), where he led a class on graphics at the International Youth Festival of Arts.

Krsmanović was admitted to the Faculty of Fine Arts in Belgrade (then: Academy of Fine Arts) in 1962 as an assistant professor in the painting department, and in 1964 he moved to the graphics department as an assistant professor, in the subject of Graphics and Drawing. He was elected to the title of full professor in 1983.

With a group of Yugoslav and Norwegian artists, Krsmanović worked on a map of graphics in Oslo in 1975. He stayed in the United States from 1979 to 1980 as a Fulbright Scholar. There he taught as a visiting professor at Bryn Mawr and Haverford colleges in Pennsylvania. At the invitation of the Scottish Arts Council, he was a visiting professor at the College of Edinburgh (1981). At the invitation of the Peacock Printmakers Workshop, Krsmanović was in Aberdeen in 1989, and at the invitation of the Tamarind Institute of Lithography in Albuquerque in 1990.

Krsmanović belonged to the artistic community known as the Belgrade Graphic Circle. He translated professional literature, spoke and wrote about graphic technology and new processes, organizational problems, as well as professional ethics and the code of graphic originality.

== Artwork ==
As an illustrator, Krsmanović worked with a refined sense of line and tactile values of drawings, and with the same painterly feeling, he created illustrations with intense color. Between focusing on drawing and color, his artistic activity moved within the scope of the concept of illustration for children. He illustrated children's literature with psychologically perfect metaphors.

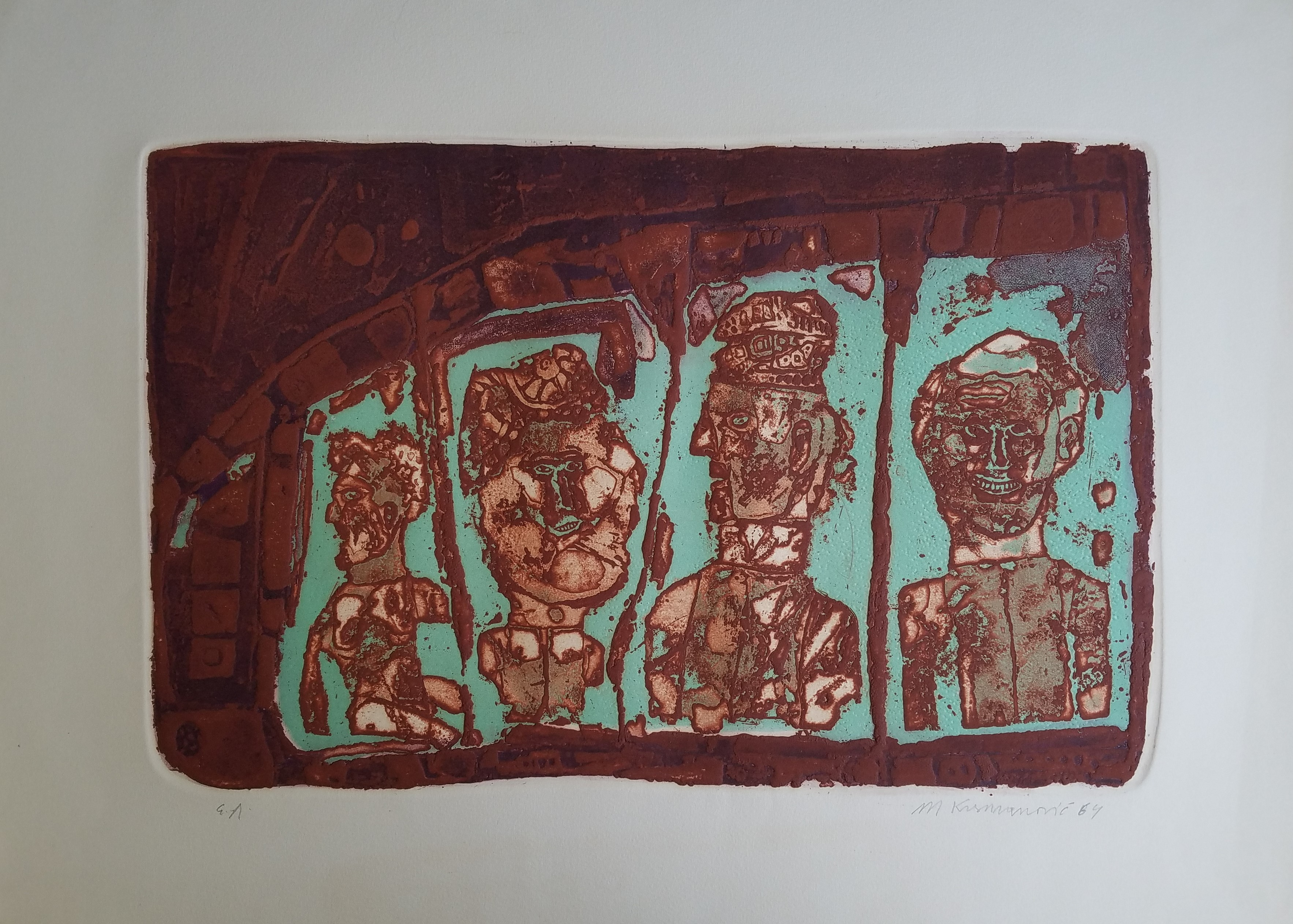
"Four Figures" is a print by Marko Krsmanović from 1964 in the etching-aquatint technique, for which he received the Grand Seal Award from the Graphic Collective Gallery in Belgrade.

Krsmanović studied painting, but in his creative practice, he preferred graphics to painting, and thus, on the art scene, he established himself primarily as a graphic artist. He recognized the strongest creative code in graphics because he understood graphics as the joy of creation in an ongoing process. Thus, in his graphic work, he devoted most of his time to unconventional exploration of the possibilities of color intaglio printing techniques. In it, he found the appeal of the means of work, the laminated plate being for him a matrix that receives data. He belonged to the generation that in the 60s and 70s was obsessed with the expression of pictorial matter, which was cherished as a value in the poetics of Informel; instead of a strictly controlled process, he cherished a liberated relationship with the graphic matrix in the name of exploring subtle tactile values and the expression of the material.

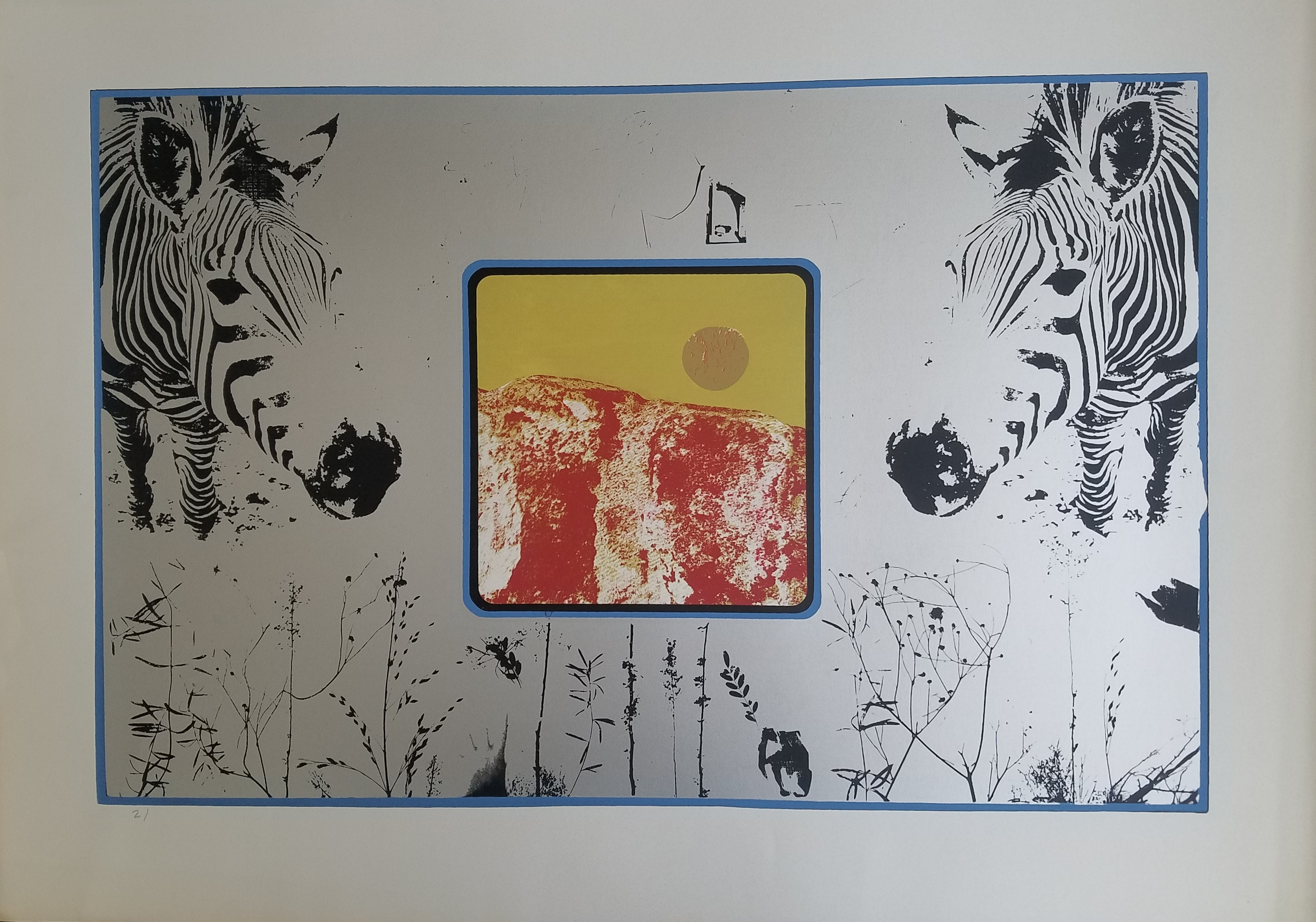
"Return to Nature - Zebras", an artwork by Marko Krsmanović from 1973 printed in the serigraphy technique.

In graphics and painting, he has built a world of fantasy. In endless mystical spaces, he transposed the metamorphoses of human beings into archetypal sites, animals and plants into anthropomorphic forms that float like wisps of fog. He achieved dense saturated matter, cracked patina texture, colored and plastic relief effects by specific deep etching of the plate and combinations of graphic techniques.

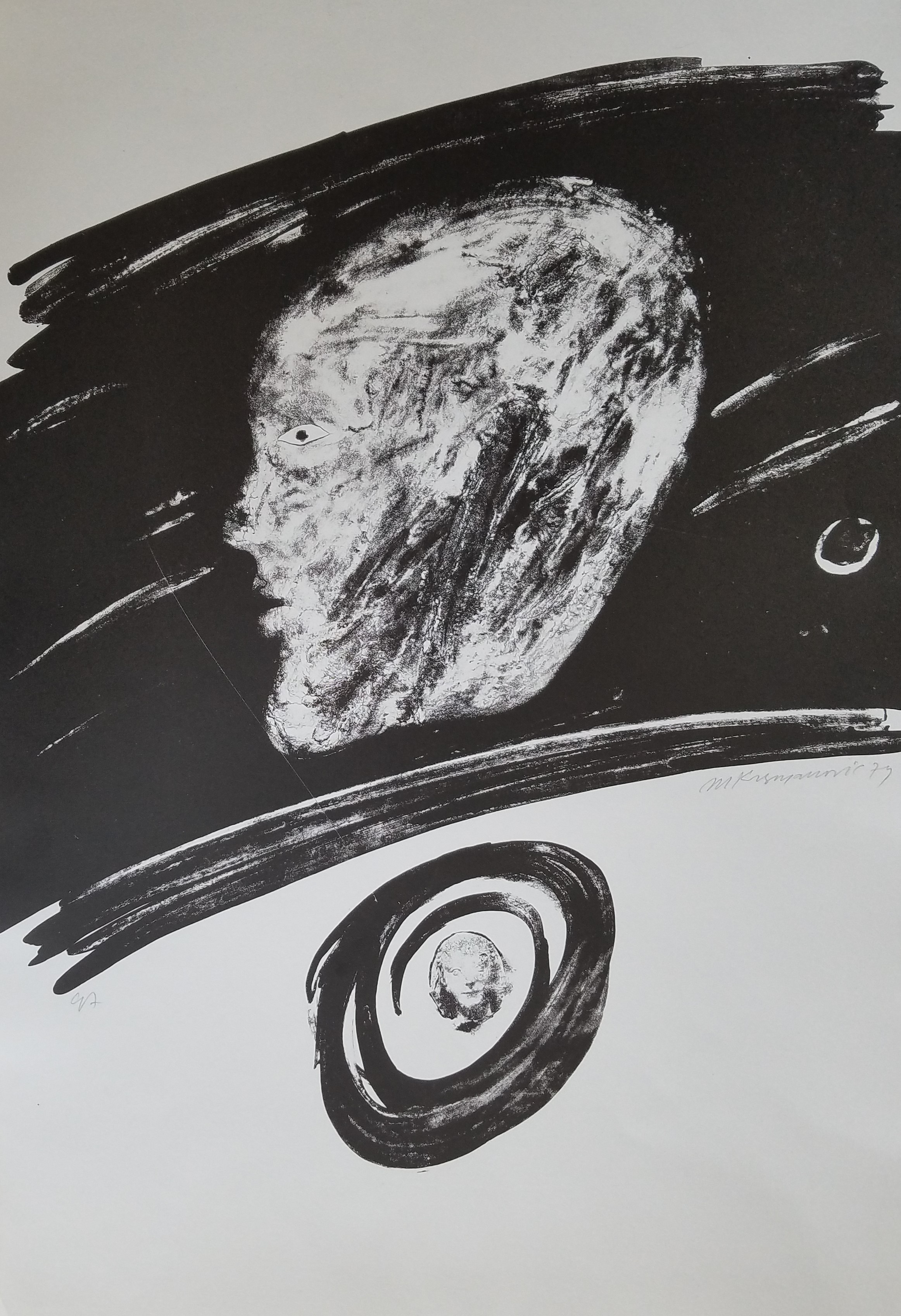
"Head", an artwork by Marko Krsmanović from 1979 printed in the lithography technique.

Krsmanović is the second laureate of the Great Seal Award, in 1964, for the print "Four Figures" in the intaglio printing technique. Explaining their decision for the award, the jury consisting of Boško Karanović, Milivoj Nikolajević and Bogdan Kršić stated:

“Krsmanović has remarkably harmonized a high graphic requirement with his world of original figurativeness. This world with its frontally placed figures is also an unusually rich projection of psychological spatiality. Krsmanović miraculously removes and puts on the masks of his figures with a gentle smile of a creation that is at the same time deeply humane, which presents him as an artist of clear and found desires. The awarded work unequivocally depicts a great graphic experience that, through a new way of processing a metal plate, adds new elements to the graphic sheet close to the values of plastic.”

In 1970, Krsmanović himself explained his creative passion for researching intaglio printing:

“One of the decisive reasons I workied with intaglio techniques from metal plates is, first of all, the attractiveness of the means of work and the unusual qualities of the structure of the printed colored surfaces and lines. Furthermore, in the successive process of execution, in the effective fixation of many tactile, often accidental data, in the possibility of controlling the erosive or destructive process, that is, directing it, in the possibility of depositing new data over the old. There is one, I would say, mystical phenomenon that is in some way a symbolic repetition of the process in nature (at least that feeling exists in me) and which prevails over peripheral impressions of the power of organization, machine and technology...”

On the day of Marko Krsmanović's funeral, January 14, 1991, Zoran Markuš published the following text in Politika:

"The fantasy that is considered an essential feature of his artistic expression was conditional. It was mixed with tachist-informel and abstract values, and therefore it is difficult to classify Krsmanović in the circle of the surreal. Although educated on the foundations of modernism, he was not closed to the figurative content of the postmodern era. Like fragments of collage, they are applied to canvas or graphic prints, expanding the meaning of the basic content".

== Exhibitions ==
=== Solo exhibitions ===
- Gallery Grafički kolektiv, Belgrade (1957, 1959, 1964, 1965, 1969, 1974, 1977, 1980, 1990);
- Gallery Hotel Bristol, Warsaw (1960);
- Gallery Youth forum, Novi Sad (1962);
- Gallery Angle du Faubourg, Paris (1963);
- Gallery Dom JNA, Belgrade (1963);
- Gallery Ilija M. Kolarac Endowment, Belgrade (1964);
- National Museum, Vršac (1965);
- Museum of Contemporary Art, Belgrade (1969);
- Gallery of Cultural center, Belgrade (1974);
- Gallerie et Fils, Brussels (1975);
- Museum of Applied Arts, Belgrade (1977);
- Gallery Radivoj Ćirpanov, Novi Sad (1978);
- Print Room, Bryn Mawr College (1979);
- Comfort Gallery, Haverford College (1980);
- University of Connecticut, Storrs (1980);
- Yugoslav cultural center, New York (1980);
- Graphic art exhibition, Edinburgh College of Art, Edinburgh (1981);
- Graphic art exhibition, Glasgow College of Art, Glasgow (1981);
- Graphic art exhibition, Aberdeen Gallery & Museum, Aberdeen (1981, 1989);
- Graphic art exhibition, Richard Demarco Gallery, Edinburgh (1984, 1989);
- Graphic art exhibition, Gravures Tandems, Gerpinnes (1985);
- Graphic art exhibition, Chan Requicha Gallery, Rochester (1986);
- Art gallery of the House of Culture, Priština (1987);
- Graphic art exhibition, Yugoslav Cultural Center, Paris (1988);
- Graphic art exhibition, Gallery of the House of Culture "Veliša Leković", Bar (1988);
- Graphic art exhibition, Gallery Karas, Zagreb (1989);
- Graphic art exhibition, Gallery of Serbian Academy of Sciences and Arts, Belgrade (1990).

=== Retrospective exhibition ===
- Museum of Contemporary Art, Belgrade (1987);

=== Posthumous exhibitions ===
- Graphic art exhibition, Gallery Stara Kapetanija, Zemun (1992);
- "Marko Krsmanović (1930−1991)", Museum of Contemporary Art, Belgrade (2000);
- „Selection from printmakers portfolio“, Gallery Grafički kolektiv, Belgrade (2016).

=== Group exhibitions ===
- IV Exhibition of Association of Fine Artists of Yugoslavia, Ljubljana (1956);
- Exhibition of illustrations, Workers university "Djuro Salaj", Belgrade (1960);
- Exhibition of the group "Danas", Belgrade (1960);
- Bianco e Nero, Lugano (1960);
- Golden Feather (Serbian Cyrillic: Златно перо), Belgrade (1960);
- Exhibition of Yugoslav graphic art, Zagreb (1960−1988);
- British Graphic Art, RWC Gallery, London (1961);
- October Salon (Serbian Cyrillic: Октобарски салон), Belgrade (1960, 1961, 1962, 1978);
- Contemporary Yugoslav Graphic Art, Oslo (1962);
- Blue Salon (Serbian Cyrillic: Плави салон), Zadar (1962, 1964, 1974);
- Biennial of the Young, Modern gallery, Rijeka (1963);
- Prints of the Belgrade Circle (Serbian Cyrillic: Графика Београдског круга), Belgrade (1963−1979);
- International graphic arts exhibition, Ljubljana (1961−1987);
- Contemporary Yugoslav Graphic Art, Rio de Janeiro (1963);
- Salon Bossio, Monte Carlo (1963);
- III Exhibition, Gallerie Jacques Casanova, Paris (1964);
- Contemporary Yugoslav Graphic Art, Brussels (1964);
- Third Fie Art Summit - Graphic Arts of Yugoslavia, Palić (1964);
- Contemporary Yugoslav Graphic Art, Prague (1964, 1968);
- Triennial of Yugoslav Fine Art, Belgrade (1964, 1967, 1970);
- Yugoslav Graphic Art, Ernst Múzeum, Budapest (1965);
- Intergrafik, Berlin (1965);
- XX century Yugoslav Graphic Art, Belgrade (1965);
- International Biennial of Fine Art, Alexandria (1965−1966);
- Biennial of the Young, Paris (1965);
- Yugoslav Graphics and Tapestries, Museo de bellas artes, Caracas (1965);
- Graphics Biennial, Krakow (1966−1970);
- Selected works from the collection of the Museum of Contemporary Art in Belgrade, Moscow (1967);
- Autumn Salon, Paris (1967);
- PAX 67, Bremen (1967);
- I Graphics Biennial, Buenos Aires (1968);
- Exhibition of Yugoslav Graphic Arts, Bitola (1968, 1981);
- Critics' choice, Belgrade (1969);
- International exhibition of illustration for children, Bologna (1969−1976);
- International Graphics Biennial, Frechen (1970, 1972, 1974);
- II International British Graphic Arts Biennial, Bradford (1970);
- International Exhibition of Arts and Science Fiction, Trieste (1970);
- III Graphics Biennial, Florence (1972);
- Contemporary Serbian Graphic Art, Ljubljana, Skopje (1972);
- Exhibition of Belgrade Artists, Ljubljana (1973);
- International Graphics Exhibition, Segovia (1974);
- Exhibition of Yugoslav Graphic Arts, Rochester (1974, 1975, 1976);
- Winter Salon (Serbian Cyrillic: Зимски салон), Herceg Novi (1974);
- I International Graphic Arts Biennial, Givet (1975);
- Art Summit - exhibition of graphic arts, Subotica (1975);
- Exhibition of the winners of the "Great Seal" award, Belgrade (1976);
- Jeune Gravure Contemporaine, Paris, Nice (1977);
- Jubilee exhibition 40 years of FLU, Belgrade (1977);
- Art in Yugoslavia (1970−1977), Sarajevo, Belgrade (1978);
- Five Graphic Artists, Baak Gallery, Boston (1978);
- I European Graphic Arts Biennial, Heidelberg (1979);
- International Art-Expo, New York (1980);
- Invited Artists, University of Central Florida, Orlando (1980);
- II Biennial of Yugoslav Fine Art, New York (1980);
- V Graphics Biennial, Condè-sur-Escaut, Bonsecours (1984);
- International Art-Expo, London (1989).

== Awards ==
- Award for illustration from the publishing house "Mlado Pokolenje" (1951);
- Award for illustration from the publishing house "Dečija Knjiga" and the Ministry of Culture (1959);
- Award at the First Exhibition "NOB in the Works of Yugoslav Artists" (1961);
- Award for graphics at the 5th October Salon, Belgrade (1964);
- Award for the Great Seal of the Graphic Collective Gallery, Belgrade (1964);
- October Award of the City of Belgrade (1969);
- "Neven" Award for the best illustration of children's literature (1968, 1969, 1978, 1979);
- Second award for illustration of children's literature at the International Book Fair, Belgrade (1969);
- Award from the publishing house "Mlado Pokolenje" at the Golden Feather exhibition, Belgrade (1970);
- Award for graphics at the Winter Salon in Herceg Novi (1974);
- Golden Needle of ULUS (1975);
- First Prize for Book Design at the International Book Fair, Belgrade (1976);
- Award of the Cultural and Educational Community of Belgrade for the exhibition at the Museum of Applied Arts, Belgrade (1977);
- Second Prize for Book Design at the International Book Fair, Belgrade (1987);
- JAZU Award at the Exhibition of Yugoslav Graphics, Zagreb (1988);
- Award from the Ivan Tabaković Foundation of the Academy of Fine Arts of Serbia for a Significant Contribution to Contemporary Fine Arts, Belgrade (1988);
- Special Award for Lifetime Contribution to the Art of Graphics at the First Biennial of Graphics, Belgrade (1989).

== See also ==
- List of painters from Serbia
- Serbian art
