= Face TV (Bosnia and Herzegovina) =

Bosnian television station

- Country: Bosnia and Herzegovina
- Broadcast area: Bosnia and Herzegovina
- Headquarters: Sarajevo

Programming
- Language(s): Bosnian
- Picture format: 16:9 1080i HDTV

Ownership
- Owner: FACE Sarajevo d.o.o.

History
- Launched: 2012

Links
- Website: www.face.ba

Availability

Streaming media
- Online streaming (certain shows): On website

FACE TV or FACE TV HD is a Bosnian commercial HDTV television channel based in Sarajevo. The founder of Face TV is the Bosnian journalist, news anchor and TV host Senad Hadžifejzović. It has started broadcasting its own experimental programs on January 15, 2012.
The programs are broadcast in HD 24 hours a day in Bosnian. Its television studio is located at the top of the Bosmal City Center in Sarajevo.

== Current programming line-up ==
This television channel broadcasts a variety of programs such as news, talk shows, entertainment and sport magazines, movies and documentaries.

=== News program ===
- Euronews - As the exclusive Bosnian partner of Euronews, Face TV broadcasts its latest news bulletins in English (every day from 4:30 pm to 5:30 pm)
- Redakcija – Newsroom themed information program that airs before the main news program (at 6:45 pm)
- Dnevnik – main news program broadcast every night at 7:15 pm (with sport and weather bulletins)
- Face to Face - talk show hosted by Senad Hadžifejzović (broadcast on Friday and Saturday)
- Centralni Dnevnik - news program hosted by Senad Hadžifejzović

=== Entertainment program ===
- Star in the car - Program in which celebrities are interviewed by Sabina Sidro while she's driving. The program aired also on N1.
