= Biomolecules and Biomedicine =

- Discipline: Medicine
- Language: English
- Edited by: Semir Vranić, Nicolai J. Wewer Albrechtsen

Publication details
- Former name: Bosnian Journal of Basic Medical Sciences
- History: 1998–present
- Publisher: Association of Basic Medical Sciences of Federation of Bosnia and Herzegovina (Bosnia and Herzegovina)
- Frequency: Monthly
- Open access: Yes
- License: CC BY
- Impact factor: 2.2 (2024)

Standard abbreviations
- ISO 4: Biomol. Biomed.

Indexing
- ISSN: 2831-0896 (print); 2831-090X (web)
- OCLC no.: 1402523140
- Bosnian Journal of Basic Medical Sciences
- ISSN: 1512-8601 (print); 1840-4812 (web)
- OCLC no.: 609707140

Links
- Journal homepage; Online access; Online archive

Biomolecules and Biomedicine is a monthly peer-reviewed open-access medical journal published by the Association of Basic Medical Sciences of Federation of Bosnia and Herzegovina. The journal covers research across the spectrum of pre-clinical studies, translational medicine, and clinical research. It was established in 1998 as the Bosnian Journal of Basic Medical Sciences, obtaining its current name in 2023.

== Abstracting and indexing ==
The journal is abstracted and indexed in:

- CAB Abstracts
- Directory of Open Access Journals
- EBSCO databases
- Embase
- Index Medicus/MEDLINE/PubMed
- Science Citation Index Expanded
- Scopus

According to the Journal Citation Reports, the journal has a 2024 impact factor of 2.2. This figure reflects citations to articles published in 2023. In contrast, the journal still maintains an impact factor of 3.1 for citations to articles published in 2022 under the title BJBMS. The unofficial combined average impact factor for 2024 is 2.8.
