= Sarajevo National Theatre =

Theatre in Sarajevo, Bosnia and Herzegovina

Coordinates: 43.8569°N 18.4208°E

- Official logo

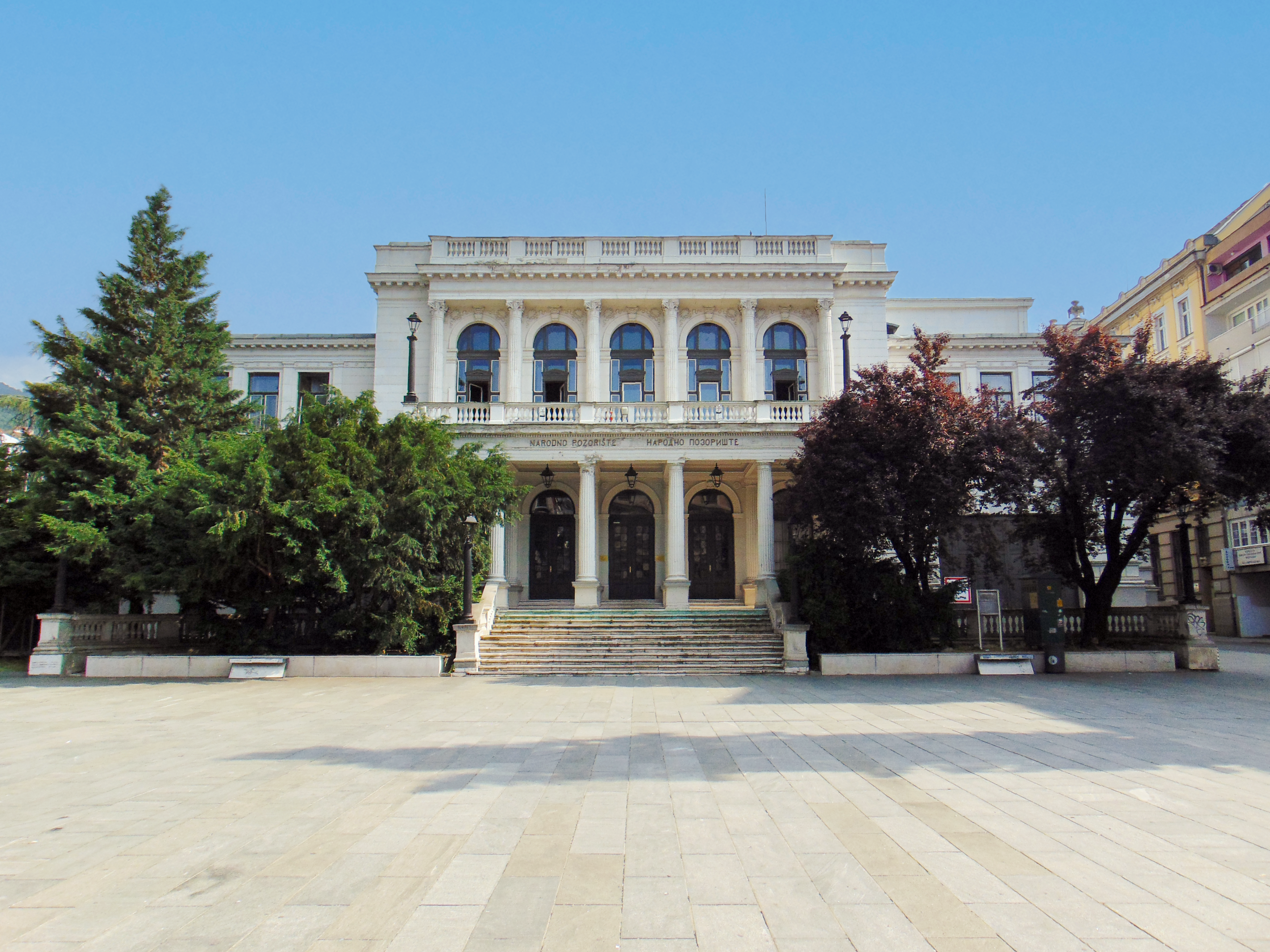
- Susan Sontag Square and National Theatre in Sarajevo
- Interactive map of Sarajevo National Theatre
- Address: Obala Kulina Bana 9, 71000 Sarajevo; Sarajevo; Bosnia and Herzegovina
- Capacity: 400

Construction
- Built: 1897
- Opened: 1921; 105 years ago
- Renovated: 1946, 1996
- Architect: Karel Pařík

Website
- www.nps.ba

The Sarajevo National Theatre (Bosnian and Serbian: Narodno pozorište Sarajevo, Народно позориште Сарајево, Croatian: Narodno kazalište Sarajevo) is the largest theatre in Bosnia and Herzegovina and one of the most important cultural institutions in Southeastern Europe.

== History ==
The founding of the Sarajevo National Theatre is marked by two significant dates. The first was 27 November 1920, when in the city of Tuzla, the theatre presented Hasanaginica by Aleksa Šantić and Jedva steče zeta by Labiche and Michel at the Bristol Hotel. The official inauguration, however, took place on 22 October 1921, marking the opening of its first season in the adapted building of the Social Hall in Sarajevo.

The opening ceremonies spanned three days, drawing large audiences and numerous distinguished guests. Branislav Nušić, then Head of the Department of Arts at the Ministry of Education in Belgrade, delivered a welcoming address, which was met with “enthusiastic applause.” Following his speech, music and dramatic performances took place over several days, with the first official productions being Nušić’s Protekcija on 23 October 1921, and Molière’s The Imaginary Invalid on 24 October 1921. The first opera performed in Sarajevo was Porin by Vatroslav Lisinski, staged in 1925 by the Opera from Osijek.

Initially, The Sarajevo National Theatre operated solely as a dramatic theatre. In 1946, music performances were introduced, significantly enriching the theatre's offerings with the addition of Opera and Ballet. As the country’s central theatre, it has been pivotal to the artistic and cultural life of Bosnia and Herzegovina, especially through its organizational structure, which includes three ensembles: Drama, Opera, and Ballet. On 9 November 1946, the Sarajevo Opera premiered with a performance of The Bartered Bride by Bedřich Smetana, an event that marked a major milestone in Bosnian musical culture.

The Sarajevo Ballet was also founded in 1946, with its first independent production, The Harvest by Boris Papandopulo, performed on 25 May 1950. This performance marked the beginning of the ballet’s professional presence on the National Theatre’s stage. Over the years, the National Theatre Sarajevo has contributed to the development of drama and new dramatic forms, as well as an authentic interpretation of classics across Drama, Opera, and Ballet, and has enriched the music repertoire for opera and ballet within Bosnian-Herzegovinian culture. The theatre has premiered numerous works by local and international playwrights, including Vlado Milošević’s The Badger Before the Court, Asim Horozić’s Hasanaginica and Aska and the Wolf, and Đelo Jusić’s Katarina, the Bosnian Queen.

By 1996, when the Sarajevo National Theatre celebrated its 75th anniversary, it had involved more than 1,600 actors, opera singers, ballet dancers, and other theatre professionals. During this period, it had staged 1,040 dramatic premieres and 264 opera and ballet projects. The theatre has performed extensively across Bosnia and Herzegovina and internationally.

== The National Theatre Building ==
Originally called the “Social House,” the National Theatre building in Sarajevo was constructed in 1897 based on designs by Karel Pařík. It officially opened on 2 January 1899, with a production of Medea by Franz Grillparzer, performed by the Croatian National Theatre from Zagreb, with Silvije Strahimir Kranjčević reading the prologue. The building served as a social club and a performance venue during the Austro-Hungarian administration, hosting theatre productions in what was referred to as “Saaltheater.” In 1922, the building was repurposed as the National Theatre.

== National Monument Status ==
In September 2008, Bosnia and Herzegovina’s Commission to Preserve National Monuments designated the National Theatre building as a national monument. The decision was made by a commission consisting of Zeynep Ahunbay, Amra Hadžimuhamedović, Dubravko Lovrenović, Ljiljana Ševo, and Tina Wik. The building itself is an architectural landmark, featuring a neo-Renaissance style and a rectangular structure measuring approximately 50 by 47 meters.

== Awards ==
- 1970: Sixth of April Sarajevo Award for the National Theatre’s Ballet
- 1972: Sixth of April Sarajevo Award for Drama
- 1978: Sixth of April Sarajevo Award for the play Omer Pasha Latas
