= Mustafa Ajanović =

Yugoslavian doctor and politician

16th President of the Assembly of FK Sarajevo
- In office 1973–1974
- Preceded by: Vaso Radić
- Succeeded by: Duško Cvijetić

Personal details
- Born: 1 March 1927 Rogatica, Kingdom of Yugoslavia
- Died: 31 July 1990 (aged 63) Sarajevo, SFR Yugoslavia
- Party: Communist League of Yugoslavia
- Spouse: Nada Ajanović
- Children: Zijad Ajanović, Silva Ajanović
- Education: University of Belgrade, University of Sarajevo
- Profession: Doctor of Medicine, politician, sports administrator

Mustafa Ajanović (1 March 1927 – 31 July 1990) was a notable Yugoslav medical doctor, politician, sports administrator and minister in the governments of SR Bosnia and Herzegovina and SFR Yugoslavia.

== Early life ==
He was born into a prominent and wealthy Bosniak family on 1 March 1927 in the small Bosnian town of Rogatica. Even though his family was of a Beurgeois background, revolutionary politics were always a talking point in the household. His older brother Zejnil joined the illegal Communist Party of Yugoslavia in 1938 and became a notable Partisan during the Axis occupation of the country. Mustafa Ajanović completed his primary education in his hometown, before moving to Sarajevo for his secondary studies on the eve of the war. After peace was restored he enrolled in the University of Belgrade to study medicine, before transferring to the newly founded University of Sarajevo where he earned his degree in 1953. He completed his specialization in Nephrology three years later.

== Medical career ==
He was granted an internship in Banja Luka after which he moved back to his home town where he was named director of the local health center, which he ran until 1966. He was next transferred to Mostar and appointed director of the Social Insurance Institute before finally being appointed Minister of health in the government of SR Bosnia and Herzegovina. After his mandate expired he was named director of the Sarajevo Health Center. In 1983 he was appointed president of the Self-governing associated organization of work of the University Clinical Center of Sarajevo - a post he held until his retirement. He was a deputy in the government of SFR Yugoslavia from 1979 to 1983.

== Sports ==
As an avid supporter of Yugoslav First League football club FK Sarajevo, he was a long-standing steering committee member and club chairman from 1973 to 1974.
