= 1978 in science =

The year 1978 in science and technology involved some significant events, listed below.

== Astronomy and space science ==
- March 2 – Vladimír Remek becomes the first Czechoslovak in space and the first cosmonaut from a country other than the Soviet Union or the United States, onboard Soyuz 28.
- June 22 – James W. Christy at the United States Naval Observatory discovers Charon, the first moon of Pluto identified.
- October – It is first proposed that Janus and Epimetheus are two separate moons of Saturn sharing the same orbit.

== Computer science ==
- February 16 – The first computer bulletin board system is created (CBBS in Chicago, Illinois).
- The RSA algorithm for public-key cryptography, based on the factoring problem, is first publicly described by Ron Rivest, Adi Shamir and Leonard Adleman.

== Geophysics ==
- James Byerlee determines Byerlee's law which gives the stress circumstances in the Earth's crust at which fracturing along a geological fault takes place.

== History of science ==
- October 17 – James Burke's history of science series Connections first airs, on BBC Television in the United Kingdom (with accompanying book).

== Paleontology ==
- Fossils of Saint Bathans mammal first collected.
- Fossil footprints of bipedal hominini from 3.6M BP found at Laetoli in Tanzania in 1976 are excavated by Mary Leakey's team.
- A fossilized partial human cranium is among hominid remains found in Apidima Cave in southern Greece; in 2019 it is announced as dating to more than 210,000 years BP, making it the earliest example of Homo sapiens outside Africa.

== Physiology and medicine ==
- May 13 – "Basaglia Law" (Mental Health Act) in Italy requires closing down of all psychiatric hospitals and their replacement with community services.
- July 25 – Louise Brown becomes the world's first human born from in vitro fertilisation, in England.
- August – Osteocalcin first identified in animal bone.
- September 6 – Production of the first genetically engineered synthetic "human" insulin using E. coli by Arthur Riggs and Keiichi Itakura at the Beckman Research Institute of the City of Hope National Medical Center in collaboration with Herbert Boyer at Genentech is announced in California.
- The rare genetic disorder Pitt–Hopkins syndrome is first described.
- Victor Skumin first describes "cardioprosthetic psychopathological syndrome", later known as "Skumin syndrome", a form of anxiety suffered by recipients of artificial heart valves.
- Imposter syndrome is first described as a phenomenon.

== Awards ==
- Fields Prize in Mathematics: Pierre Deligne, Charles Fefferman, Grigory Margulis, Daniel Quillen
- Nobel Prizes
  - Physics – Pyotr Leonidovich Kapitsa, Arno Allan Penzias, Robert Woodrow Wilson
  - Chemistry – Peter D. Mitchell
  - Medicine – Werner Arber, Daniel Nathans, Hamilton O. Smith
- Turing Award – Robert Floyd

== Births ==
- March 16 – Jemma Redmond (d. 2016), Irish biochemist, pioneer of 3D bioprinting
- July – Caucher Birkar, born Fereydoun Derakhshani, Kurdish-born mathematician
- November 1 – Helen Czerski, English physicist and science populariser

== Deaths ==
- January 14 – Kurt Gödel (b. 1906), American mathematician
- February 25 – Edith Humphrey (b. 1875), English chemist
- March 9 – Gaston Julia (b. 1893), French mathematician
- March 23 – Haim Ernst Wertheimer (b. 1893), Jewish biochemist
- March 30 – Bill Hamilton (b. 1899), New Zealand mechanical engineer
- March 31 – Charles Best (b. 1899), Canadian medical scientist
- April 21 – Thomas Wyatt Turner (b. 1877), American civil rights activist, biologist and educator; first black person ever to receive a doctorate from Cornell University
- July 22 – André Chapelon (b. 1892), French steam locomotive designer
- September 15 – Willy Messerschmitt (b. 1898), German aircraft engineer
- November 15 – Margaret Mead (b. 1901), American cultural anthropologist
