= Benjamin Djulbegovic =

American physician-scientist

- Born: Sarajevo, Bosnia and Herzegovina, Yugoslavia
- Known for: methods to address uncertainty in scientific and medical evidence and clinical decision-making

Benjamin Djulbegovic is an American physician-scientist whose academic and research focus revolves around optimizing clinical research and the practice of medicine by comprehending the nature of medical evidence and decision-making. In his work, he has integrated concepts from evidence-based medicine (EBM), predictive analytics, health outcomes research, and the decision sciences.

== Biography ==
Djulbegovic was born in Sarajevo, Bosnia and Herzegovina, Yugoslavia. He was trained both in basic sciences and clinical medicine. In 1983, Djulbegovic earned his medical degree and PhD in biomedical sciences from the University of Sarajevo. He earned an M.S. degree in biophysics from the University of Zagreb (1983–1985) and was trained in internal medicine and hematology at the University of Sarajevo, Belgrade, and Christie Hospital, Manchester, England. Subsequently, he completed his residency in internal medicine and a fellowship in hematology and medical oncology at the University of Louisville School of Medicine in the United States (1988–1991). Djulbegovic then joined the University of Louisville as an assistant (and later, associate) professor (1996–1998). In 1998 he moved to the H. Lee Moffitt Cancer Center and the University of South Florida (USF), where he became a full professor.

During his tenure with the H. Lee Moffitt Cancer Center and the University of South Florida, where he was appointed as a Distinguished Professor of the university (2010–2017), he founded the Center for Evidence-Based Medicine and the Health Outcomes Research Center as a foundation for later development of core in research methods and biostatistics at USF. At USF he also served as the associate dean for clinical research (2012–2013).

From 2017 to 2023, he served as a professor at the City of Hope National Medical Center, Beckman Research Institute, CA. Since 2023, Djulbegovic has served as the director of the Hematology Stewardship Program at the Medical University of South Carolina in Charleston, SC and as an affiliate member of the Meta-Research Innovation Center at Stanford University. As of January 2024, his body of work had received over 52k citations with an h-index of 78. He has authored over 400 papers in peer-reviewed journals, four books, over 200 abstracts, book chapters, and editorials.

== Linking evidence-based medicine with decision-making ==
Djulbegovic's work includes the coherent linkage of evidence-based medicine (EBM) to formal systems in decision sciences. His collaboration with colleague Iztok Hozo summarized their previous work in the book "Threshold Models For Decision-Making in Clinical Medicine," published in 2023. This work illustrates the connection between EBM and structured frameworks in the decision sciences in accordance with cited peer-reviewed work.

Djulbegovic has argued that underuse and overuse observed in clinical practice is a consequence of a relationship between scientific evidence (that exists on a continuum of credibility) and decision-making (that is, categorical, yes/no exercises, as decisions, have to be made) that creates the Sorites paradox. At which point is the probability of disease or outcomes sufficiently high or low enough for us to act?

He and Hozo proposed threshold models as a rational (and pragmatic) way to address the Sorites paradox. Djulbegovic et al. have also posited that the appropriateness of care, whether underuse or overuse, depends on the choice of a decision-theoretical framework.

He contributed to understanding of the processes of evidence-based clinical practice guidelines. Medical Guidelines are widely considered as essential vehicles for improving persistently suboptimal healthcare. However, because guidelines have their problems, Djulbegovic has also argued that further improvement of guidelines processes is only possible within a decision-analytical framework. In particular, he has argued that clinical practice guidelines can be improved if they are translated into clinical pathways and fast-and-frugal trees within the framework of threshold decision models to develop more individualized patient care.

These principles were translated into the systematic application of the science of EBM and decision analysis in the fields of hematology and oncology, The work was reviewed in hematology and oncology by the Journal of the National Cancer Institute.

== Law of therapeutic discoveries ==
Through the analysis of the role of uncertainty in medicine and the clinical equipoise principle, Djulbegovic introduced the concept of "the law of therapeutic discovery." This theory predicts a 50-70% success rate in discovering new treatments in randomized clinical trials (RCT) based on the foundational ethical and scientific justification for conducting trials in humans.

This principle - which links key precepts of moral philosophy with theories of rational decision-making is further explained and demonstrated in a BMJ manuscript that asks and then answers "Are experimental treatments for cancer in children superior to established treatments?" Furthermore, Djulbegovic communicates how uncertainty and a loss of equipoise can fuel misinformation in patient populations.

== Rational clinical decision-making and development of "acceptable regret" theory ==
Together with Hozo, Djulbegovic developed the decision-theoretical concept of "acceptable regret." This concept allows clinicians, scientists, and policymakers to determine when they can accept findings, even if proven wrong later. "Acceptable regret" has been used to explain both underuse and overuse in the delivery of health services, offering insights into the decision-making process of satisficing in clinical practice. The concept is held to shed light on why most people, whether patients or relatives caring for patients at the end-of-life require almost absolute certainty of imminent death before accepting referrals to hospice.

== Dramatic works ==
Djulbegovic translated his scientific writings on uncertainty into a play titled "An Impossible Decision: The Life Interrupted by Uncertainty." Using the Socratic dialogue and playwright format, he illustrates the applicability of theoretical concepts of the science of uncertainty to real-life decision-making and how they matter to all of us individually and collectively.

== Awards and honors ==
In his early career, he was awarded the Thomas C. Chalmers Award for empirical verification of the uncertainty (equipoise) principle (1999). His group's work was also recognized with a second Chalmers award in 2012.

In 2017 he received an award for Excellence In Person Centered Healthcare at the Fourth Annual Conference of the European Society for Person Centered Healthcare (ESPCH4), Westminster Cathedral Hall, London.

== Selected publications ==
- Djulbegovic, Benjamin; Guyatt, Gordon H (July 2017). "Progress in evidence-based medicine: a quarter century on". The Lancet. 390 (10092): 415–423. doi:10.1016/S0140-6736(16)31592-6. PMID 28215660. S2CID 46762513.
- Djulbegovic, Benjamin; Hozo, Iztok (2023). "Evidence and Decision-Making". Threshold Decision-making in Clinical Medicine. Cancer Treatment and Research. Vol. 189. pp. 1–24. doi:10.1007/978-3-031-37993-2_1. ISBN 978-3-031-37992-5. PMID 37789157.
- Djulbegovic, Benjamin; Hozo, Iztok (2023). Threshold Decision-making in Clinical Medicine: With Practical Application to Hematology and Oncology. Cancer Treatment and Research. Vol. 189. doi:10.1007/978-3-031-37993-2. ISBN 978-3-031-37992-5. S2CID 263612558.
- Djulbegovic, Benjamin; Lacevic, Mensura; Cantor, Alan; Fields, Karen K; Bennett, Charles L; Adams, Jared R; Kuderer, Nicole M; Lyman, Gary H (August 2000). "The uncertainty principle and industry-sponsored research". The Lancet. 356 (9230): 635–638. doi:10.1016/S0140-6736(00)02605-2. PMID 10968436. S2CID 13204033.
- Djulbegovic, Benjamin (March 2007). "Articulating and Responding to Uncertainties in Clinical Research". Journal of Medicine and Philosophy. 32 (2): 79–98. doi:10.1080/03605310701255719. PMID 17454416.
- Djulbegovic, Benjamin (24 March 2008). "Treatment Success in CancerNew Cancer Treatment Successes Identified in Phase 3 Randomized Controlled Trials Conducted by the National Cancer Institute–Sponsored Cooperative Oncology Groups, 1955 to 2006". Archives of Internal Medicine. 168 (6): 632–642. doi:10.1001/archinte.168.6.632. PMC 2773511. PMID 18362256.
- Hozo, Iztok; Djulbegovic, Benjamin (July 2008). "When Is Diagnostic Testing Inappropriate or Irrational? Acceptable Regret Approach". Medical Decision Making. 28 (4): 540–553. doi:10.1177/0272989X08315249. PMID 18480041. S2CID 23603061.
- Djulbegovic, Benjamin; Hozo, Iztok (27 February 2007). "When Should Potentially False Research Findings Be Considered Acceptable?". PLOS Medicine. 4 (2) e26. doi:10.1371/journal.pmed.0040026. PMC 1808081. PMID 17326703.
- Djulbegovic, Benjamin; Beckstead, Jason W.; Elqayam, Shira; Reljic, Tea; Hozo, Iztok; Kumar, Ambuj; Cannon-Bowers, Janis; Taylor, Stephanie; Tsalatsanis, Athanasios; Turner, Brandon; Paidas, Charles (July 2014). "Evaluation of Physicians' Cognitive Styles". Medical Decision Making. 34 (5): 627–637. doi:10.1177/0272989X14525855. PMID 24722474. S2CID 3799089.
