= Steven T. Rosen =

American academic administrator

- Born: New York City
- Education: Northwestern University
- Scientific career
- Fields: Oncology, Hematologic malignancies
- Workplaces: City of Hope National Medical Center, Northwestern University, National Cancer Institute

External videos
- "Imerman Angels Partnership With City of Hope", Imerman Angels
- "City of Hope: Robert Stone, Steven Rosen, and Stephen Forman on advances in cancer research", Charlie Rose

Steven T. Rosen is the executive vice president and director emeritus of City of Hope's Beckman Research Institute and cancer center. He was previously the provost and chief scientific officer of City of Hope National Medical Center in Duarte, California. In addition to previously directing City of Hope's Comprehensive Cancer Center, he also led the Beckman Research Institute at City of Hope and the Irell & Manella Graduate School of Biological Sciences. Previously (1989-2014), Rosen was the director of the Robert H. Lurie Comprehensive Cancer Center at Northwestern University, which was awarded comprehensive cancer center status by the National Cancer Institute (NCI) in 1997.

In 2015 Rosen received a lifetime achievement award from the Israel Cancer Research Fund (ICRF) for his work in cancer research. His main areas of research involve the development of new treatments, particularly for Hematologic malignancies.

== Education ==
Rosen received his bachelor's degree and medical degree with distinction (1976) from Northwestern University. He was a resident in Internal Medicine at Northwestern. He was a fellow in Medical Oncology at the National Cancer Institute.

== Career ==
Rosen joined City of Hope on March 1, 2014 as its first provost and chief scientific officer. City of Hope has been a Comprehensive Cancer Center since 1998.

Before joining City of Hope, Rosen worked at Northwestern University. He joined Northwestern University in 1981 as a junior faculty member. He was the director of Northwestern University's Robert H. Lurie Comprehensive Cancer Center from 1989 to 2014, and the Genevieve Teuton professor of medicine at the Feinberg School of Medicine. Beginning in 1993, the center at Northwestern received National Cancer Institute (NCI) funding as a designated cancer center in the United States. In 1997, it was awarded comprehensive cancer center status by NCI.

Major areas of focus for his research include 1) the mediation of cancer cell death by glucocorticoids in hematologic malignancies 2) the use of RNA-directed nucleoside analogs in cancer therapy and 3) the role of proteins in cancer metabolism. One of the nucleoside analogs he has worked on is in trials for the treatment of acute myeloid leukemia and chronic lymphocytic leukemia. Rosen has also worked to develop novel treatments for cutaneous lymphoma.

Rosen is the author of more than 450 publications in his field. He is editor-in-chief of the book series Cancer Treatment and Research and Oncology News International.

He has served on a number of boards, including the Board of Directors of the Leukemia & Lymphoma Society (2011-2014), the American Society of Clinical Oncology's Conquer Cancer Foundation and the Scientific Advisory Board of the Multiple Myeloma Research Foundation.

Rosen is an advocate for precision medicine and translational medicine. Under his leadership, City of Hope has partnered with the Translational Genomics Research Institute (TGen).

== Other interests ==
Steven Rosen has four children. He has published a collection of poetry, Stolen moments.

== Awards ==
- 2021, Inducted into the Giants of Cancer Care® Program
- 2019, Association of American Physicians
- 2018, American Institute for Medical and Biological Engineering
- 2017, Fellow of the American Society of Clinical Oncology
- 2016, "Angel Award" for outstanding service to the Cancer community, Imerman Angels
- 2015, Lifetime achievement award, Israel Cancer Research Fund (ICRF)
- 2011, Man of Distinction Award, ICRF; Nov. 9, 2011 Declared Steven T. Rosen Day in Chicago
- 1996, Women's Board of Northwestern Memorial Hospital for Compassionate Care
- 1996, Marv Samuel Award, Chicago Baseball Cancer Charities
- 1995, Martin Luther King Humanitarian Award, Northwestern Memorial Hospital
- 1994, Northwestern University Medical School Alumni Achievement Award
- America's Top Doctors® list, Castle Connolly Medical Ltd.
- 1976, Alpha Omega Alpha
