= Marcin Kortylewski =

Polish American cancer researcher and immunologist

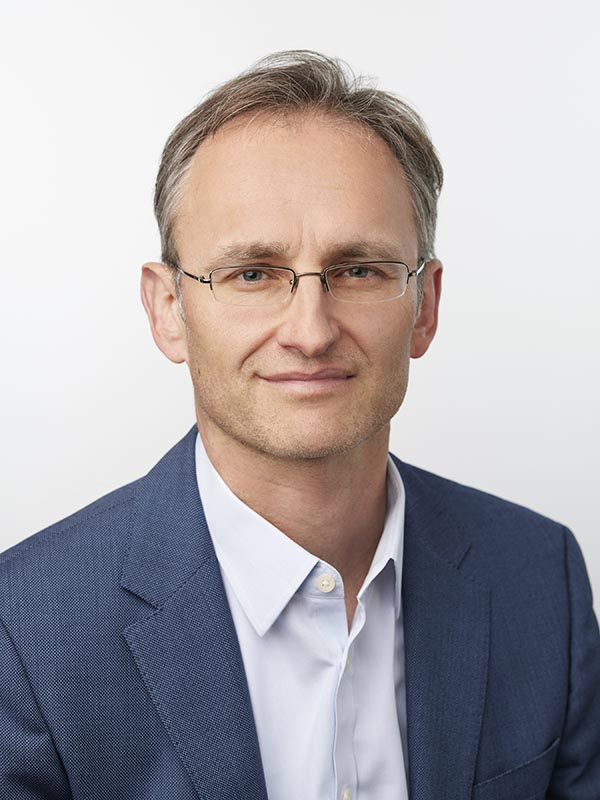
- Born: Poznań, Poland
- Years active: 1996–present

Academic background
- Education: Adam Mickiewicz University

Academic work
- Institutions: Poznań University of Medical Sciences RWTH Aachen University H. Lee Moffitt Cancer Center & Research Institute City of Hope National Medical Center
- Website: https://www.linkedin.com/in/marcin-kortylewski-6841b220/

Marcin Kortylewski is a Polish American cancer researcher and immunologist. He is currently professor of immuno-oncology at the Beckman Research Institute of the City of Hope National Medical Center in Duarte, California. His research has shown that the STAT3 protein plays a role in protecting cancers from immune responses and contributes to resistance to therapies. Later he developed a two-pronged strategy for cancer immunotherapy using simultaneous STAT3 inhibition and TLR9 immune stimulation. Kortylewski invented platform strategy for delivery of oligonucleotides, such as siRNA, miRNA, decoy DNA, antisense molecules and others to selected immune cells.

== Education ==
Kortylewski was born in Poznań, Poland. He received his M.S. in biotechnology from Adam Mickiewicz University and his Ph.D. in molecular biology from the Poznań University of Medical Sciences in Poznań, Poland. Dr. Kortylewski completed postdoctoral training in cancer biology in Institute of Biochemistry at RWTH Aachen in Germany and later in tumor immunology at H. Lee Moffitt Cancer Center in Tampa, Florida in USA.

== Career ==
Kortylewski began his post-graduate career in 1999 as a postdoctoral fellow in Iris Behrman’s lab in RWTH Aachen/Institute of Biochemistry chaired by Peter C. Heinrich. During his tenure there, he co-authored numerous research articles. Later, he moved to H. Lee Moffitt Cancer Center in Tampa, Florida in USA to train with Richard Jove and Hua Yu. In 2005, he became Assistant Research Professor in the Beckman Research Institute of the City of Hope National Medical Center in Duarte, California. There, he became tenured faculty in 2010 and full professor at the Department of Immuno-Oncology in 2021.

Kortylewski's research group focuses on understanding the mechanisms by which cancers evade the immune system and explores methods to enhance antitumor immune responses using DNA and RNA-based drugs. In early 2000s, he demonstrated that tumors turn off immune cell activity using a transcription factor, STAT3. His studies characterized STAT3 as a multitasking protein which prevents immune activation, while stimulating tumor vascularization and metastasis. Kortylewski invented a two-pronged strategy for cancer immunotherapy combining STAT3 blocking using siRNA with triggering of immune receptor, Toll-like receptor 9 (TLR9) using CpG motif DNA. Later on, he adopted the strategy as a platform for delivery of various oligonucleotide drugs to target oncogenic or immune regulators, such as STAT3, NF-kB or selected miRNAs in human or mouse immune cells in vivo.

Kortylewski is a co-founder of a biomedical startup company, currently under the name Duet Biotherapeutics Inc., focused on advancing CpG-STAT3 inhibitors to clinical trials for cancer immunotherapy. He is an active contributor to the field of immune-oncology and oligonucleotide therapeutics, serving on scientific and editorial boards of journals and various organizations.

== Awards ==
In 2016, Kortylewski was a recipient of an Outstanding Young Investigator Award from American Society of Gene and Cell Therapy, granted based on the contributions to the field of gene and cell therapy. He received the award specifically for his work on “Eliminating Tumor Immune Defenses using Oligonucleotide Therapeutics”.

== Patents ==
Patent Number	Patent Name
US 9,688,982 US 10,253,318	Methods and compositions for the treatment of cancer or other diseases
US 9,976,147 US 10,829,765	STAT3 inhibitors and uses thereof
US 10,758,624	Compounds and compositions including phosphorothioated oligodeoxynucleotide, and methods of use thereof
US 10,711,272 US 11,186,840	CTLA-4 aptamer siRNA species CTLA-4 Aptamer Conjugates
US 10,801,026	Compounds and compositions including phosphorothioated oligodeoxynucleotide, and methods of use thereof
