= Arthur Riggs (geneticist) =

American geneticist (1939–2022)

- Born: Arthur Dale Riggs; August 8, 1939; Modesto, California, U.S.
- Died: March 23, 2022 (aged 82); Duarte, California, U.S.
- Education: University of California, Riverside, California Institute of Technology
- Scientific career
- Fields: Genetics
- Workplaces: Beckman Research Institute of City of Hope National Medical Center
- Doctoral advisor: Herschel K. Mitchell
- Website: www.cityofhope.org/people/riggs-arthur

Arthur Dale Riggs (August 8, 1939 – March 23, 2022) was an American geneticist who worked with Genentech to express the first artificial gene in bacteria. His work was critical to the modern biotechnology industry because it was the first use of molecular techniques in commercial production of drugs and enabled the large-scale manufacturing of protein drugs, including insulin. He was also a major factor in the origin of epigenetics.

Riggs was a professor of biology and, in 2014, founding director of the Diabetes & Metabolism Research Institute of City of Hope National Medical Center. He was the founding dean of City of Hope's graduate school, the Irell & Manella Graduate School of Biological Sciences. He was also director emeritus of the Beckman Research Institute of City of Hope National Medical Center, which he headed from 2000 to 2007. Riggs served on the board of trustees at the Keck Graduate Institute of Applied Life Sciences. In 2006, Riggs was elected to the National Academy of Sciences.

== Early life and education ==
Riggs was born in Modesto, California, near his family's home in Ceres, California, on August 8, 1939. After the family lost their farm during the Great Depression, they moved to San Bernardino, California, where Riggs attended San Bernardino High School. He helped his father, who managed a trailer park, to build and fix things. His mother, a nurse, gave him a chemistry set to encourage his interest in chemistry and biology.

Riggs earned his undergraduate degree in chemistry at University of California, Riverside in 1961. He conducted his doctoral thesis work at the California Institute of Technology with Herschel K. Mitchell, obtaining a Ph.D. in biochemistry in 1966.

=== Mammalian DNA replication ===
As graduate students at Caltech, he and Joel A. Huberman collaborated on work that later led to a classic paper on mammalian DNA replication, which was published in 1966. They wanted to use radioactive nucleotides to tag replicating DNA and then use photographic film to produce physical images that capture what happens during replication. Their advisors were not interested in the experiment when Huberman and Riggs proposed it, and the students continued the work on their own. Using their method, they were able to measure the rate of DNA replication. The results indicated that chromosomal DNA contained many sections, which replicated independently, and that replication occurred in both directions at each section's origin. The results were important and helped to extend scientists' understanding of mammalian DNA replication. Herschel Mitchell and Giuseppe Attardi, their advisors, felt that the papers should be published under Huberman and Riggs' names, without their advisors', because they had done the work independently.

=== Protein–DNA interaction ===
Riggs moved to the Salk Institute to study protein–DNA interactions with Melvin Cohn as a postdoctoral fellow from 1966 to 1969. At the time, two proteins had been identified as binding to DNA and controlling gene expression: the lambda repressor and the lac repressor. Riggs worked on isolating the lac repressor by affinity chromatography. Walter Gilbert and Benno Müller-Hill were the first to successfully identify it, using a different technique. However, Arthur Riggs was the first to purify usable quantities of a transcription factor protein, the lac repressor. He and Suzanne Bourgeois developed a nitrocellulose filter binding assay method that was much faster than existing methods of analysis. Their work resulted in another well-known series of papers on the lac repressor and bacterial gene regulation, opening up new areas of research and theory.

== City of Hope National Medical Center ==
As a result of his interest in gene regulation in mammalian cells, Riggs became curious about X chromosome inactivation, in which one of the two copies of the X chromosome present in a female mammal is inactivated. One of its co-discoverers, Susumu Ohno, worked at the City of Hope National Medical Center. In 1969 Riggs joined the department of molecular biology at the City of Hope National Medical Center as an associate research scientist. He became a senior researcher in 1974, Associate Chair of the Division of Biology in 1979, and Chair of the Division of Biology in 1981.

=== Somatostatin and insulin ===
Riggs continued to study the lac repressor and examined gene regulation in bacteria with Richard E. Dickerson, John Rosenberg, and Keiichi Itakura. They hoped to mix E. coli lac repressor with lac operator, crystallize it, and examine the protein–DNA binding of the crystals using high-resolution DNA methylation analysis. They were able to clone Itakura's lac operator and confirm that it would work in live bacteria, an important result. They also developed a method in which researchers add short "linkers" to DNA sequences and insert them into the bacterial genome.

Riggs and Itakura collaborated with Herbert Boyer at Genentech, and used recombinant DNA technology to become the first to produce a human protein in E. coli. Following the advice of Riggs and Itakura, the group successfully produced the hormone Somatostatin in 1977 as a proof of concept before they attempted to work with the more complicated insulin molecule. They were able to link somatostatin to a larger protein, beta-galactosidase, produce it in E. coli, isolate it, and then separate the somatostatin from the galactosidase. Somatostatin was the first mammalian hormone to be produced in a bacterium.

Next, the group produced a synthetic gene coding for human insulin, one that was about ten times larger than the somatostatin encoding. They succeeded in producing artificial insulin in 1978. In 1979, Riggs received the Juvenile Diabetes Foundation Research Award for this work.

=== DNA methylation, epigenetics and antibody engineering ===
In 1973, Riggs hypothesized that X chromosome inactivation might act in ways analogous to restriction enzyme complexes such as E. coli. He eventually published a theoretical paper on the topic that correctly predicted a key mechanism for DNA methylation epigenetics. Through ongoing research he has helped to understand the mechanisms of DNA methylation and gene regulation.

In the 1980s, Riggs became convinced that the type of splicing approach used with recombinant DNA also could be used to produce antibodies. Riggs worked with Shmuel Cabilly on "fundamental technology required for the artificial synthesis of antibody molecules." Once again, Riggs and his group characterized the genes for antibodies and cloned them into bacteria. They were able to describe and patent a method for making humanized monoclonal antibodies, using mouse antibodies. They created a gene sequence that would "trick" or induce bacteria into manufacturing humanized antibodies rather than mouse antibodies. This technology has been used to produce "smart" cancer drugs such as Herceptin, Rituxan and Avastin.

In 2009, Riggs published on studies conducted with Gerd Pfeifer on the "methylome" of the genome of a human B cell, examining the DNA methylation pattern of the entire genome in an attempt to find patterns of the epigenetic mark 5-methylcytosine. DNA methylation is believed to pass information from parent cells to daughter cells, functioning as a secondary, high-fidelity information encoding system. The blood donated for the isolation of the B cells was that of Riggs himself. "It could have been anyone's DNA, but as a pioneer in DNA methylation epigenetics, there is something special to me about it being my methylome". Riggs continued to work on the epigenetic programming of the cell, designing proteins that can bind to DNA in highly specified ways, wherever desired.

=== Administration ===
Riggs was closely involved in institutional expansion at City of Hope. In the 1990s, he helped establish the City of Hope Graduate School of Biological Sciences (renamed the Irell & Manella Graduate School of Biological Sciences as of May 15, 2009) and served as its founding dean from 1994 to 1998.

During Riggs' time as chair of the Division of Biology (1981–2000), City of Hope restructured in response to a $10 million grant from the Arnold and Mabel Beckman Foundation and established the Beckman Research Institute of City of Hope. From its establishment in 1983, Riggs was chair of the Division of Biology of the Beckman Research Institute. From 2000 to 2007, he served as director of the Beckman Research Institute.

In 2014, City of Hope opened a new Diabetes & Metabolism Research Institute, building on its existing diabetes research program, with Riggs as the institute's first director.

== Personal life ==
Riggs married Jane Riggs in 1960. Together, they had three children.

Riggs died on March 23, 2022, at a hospital in Duarte, California. He was 82, and suffered lymphoma prior to his death.

== Awards ==
- Distinguished Alumni Award, California Institute of Technology, 2008
- Elected to the National Academy of Sciences, 2006
- Technology Leadership Award, 2004
- Distinguished alumnus of University of California, Riverside, 1988
- Juvenile Diabetes Research Foundation Rumbough Award, 1979
