= Daniel Wallace =

Daniel, Dan or Danny Wallace may refer to:

- Daniel Wallace (politician) (1801–1859), U.S. Congressman from South Carolina
- Daniel B. Wallace (born 1952), professor of New Testament Studies at Dallas Theological Seminary
- Daniel Wallace (author) (born 1959), American author of the novel Big Fish
- Daniel J. Wallace (born 1949), American rheumatologist, professor and author
- Danny Wallace (footballer) (born 1964), English former international footballer
- Danny Wallace (humorist) (born 1976), author of Join Me and Yes Man, and television presenter
- Dan Wallace (politician) (1942–2025), Irish politician
- Dan Wallace (swimmer) (born 1993), Scottish swimmer
- Daniel Wallace, the plaintiff in Wallace v. International Business Machines Corp. et al., a 2006 lawsuit filed against the GNU General Public License
