= Smita Bhatia =

Indian-born American oncologist

- Born: India
- Spouse: Ravi Bhatia

Academic background
- Education: MD, All India Institutes of Medical Sciences; MPH, University of Minnesota

Academic work
- Institutions: University of Alabama at Birmingham; City of Hope National Medical Center

Smita Bhatia is an Indian-born American oncologist. She is the Director of the Institute for Cancer Outcomes and Survivorship in the University of Alabama at Birmingham School of Medicine, as well as the Vice Chair for Outcomes in the Department of Pediatrics and Senior Advisor for Cancer Outcomes Research at the O'Neal Comprehensive Cancer Center at UAB.

== Early life and education ==
Bhatia was born and raised in India. She completed her medical degree and residency at the All India Institutes of Medical Sciences but moved to Minnesota for her postdoctoral fellowship. While completing her fellowships in blood banking, pediatric hematology/oncology, and bone marrow transplantation, Bhatia also completed her Master's degree in public health. During her training at the University of Minnesota, Bhatia received the 1996 Young Investigator Award from Conquer Cancer.

== Career ==
Following her fellowships, Bhatia and her husband Ravi accepted faculty positions at the City of Hope National Medical Center. During her early tenure at the City of Hope, Bhatia established a cohort of cancer patients who she followed up after blood or marrow transplants to measure their cognitive function on extensive, standardized paper-based tests. Two years later, she was appointed Founding Chair of the new Department of Population Sciences at the City of Hope. She was also elected a Member of the American Society for Clinical Investigation. Bhatia remained in this role until 2014 when she left to become the director of the Institute for Cancer Outcomes and Survivorship in the University of Alabama at Birmingham (UAB) School of Medicine.

While serving as director of the Institute for Cancer Outcomes and Survivorship, Bhatia became the principal investigator (PI) on a project on how personalized treatment of childhood cancer can minimize toxicity. She also received the 2018 Outstanding Investigator Award from the National Cancer Institute. As the PI, Bhatia also served as vice chair for Outcomes in the UAB Department of Pediatrics and senior adviser for Cancer Outcomes Research at the O’Neal Comprehensive Cancer Center at UAB. In 2021, she was appointed to the board of directors at the St. Baldrick's Foundation.

== Personal life ==
Bhatia and her husband have two children together.
