= Hua Eleanor Yu =

Cancer researcher

- Education: Columbia University
- Awards: Humboldt Research Award
- Scientific career
- Fields: Cancer research
- Workplaces: University of Michigan, Moffitt Cancer Center, Beckman Research Institute

External videos
- “Meet Hua Yu, Ph.D.”, City of Hope

Hua Eleanor Yu is the inaugural Billy and Audrey L. Wilder Professor in tumor immunotherapy at the Beckman Research Institute of the City of Hope National Medical Center in Duarte, California. In addition, she co-leads the Cancer Immunotherapeutics Program at the City of Hope cancer center, with Peter P. Lee. Yu's laboratory was the first to identify STAT3, a protein that helps to protect tumor cells from the immune system. Her group is developing possible drug treatments using CpG-Stat3 siRNA to attack tumor cells in mice and humans.

== Education ==
Yu is a niece of Tsai-Fan Yu. Yu attended Columbia University, where she obtained her B.A. in biology in 1983, and her Ph.D. in molecular biology in 1988. From 1989 to 1992, she held a postdoctoral position in molecular biology at the University of Michigan, Ann Arbor, Michigan.

== Career ==
Yu worked as a research scientist in the Department of Microbiology and Immunology at the University of Michigan from 1994 to 1995, before joining the immunology program at the Moffitt Cancer Center in Tampa, Florida. She remained there until 2005, when she became professor and associate chair of the Department of Cancer Immunotherapeutics & Tumor Immunology at the Beckman Research Institute of City of Hope in Duarte, California. In 2013, she became the inaugural Billy and Audrey L. Wilder Professor in Tumor Immunotherapy.

== Research ==
Yu and her team were the first to identify [as a critical regulator in processes influencing tumor cell growth and survival. They examined activation of the STAT3 protein, and determined that it helps to create an environment supportive of the tumor cell, protecting it from nearby immune cells.

By examining and understanding STAT3's role in tumor angiogenesis and immune evasion, they have also identified a possible molecular target for cancer therapy. Stat3 siRNA is used to disable STAT3 production, while CpG binds to the tumor cells and stimulates immune cells. In this way, CpG-Stat3 siRNA can turn off the defense mechanism of cancerous cells and prompt the immune system to attack them. Using mice as an animal model, Yu is studying the treatment of glioblastoma multiforme and B-cell lymphoma, particularly aggressive tumors that are resistant to standard forms of treatment. As of 2013 trials with human patients were being planned.

Internationally known, Yu has collaborated with Thomas Blankenstein at the Max Delbrück Center for Molecular Medicine in Germany and with Jie Liu at Fudan University, China. Technologies developed in her laboratory and that of Andreas Herrmann at City of Hope are being used by a newly formed company, LA Cell, Inc., which hopes to develop cell-penetrating antibody therapies.

Preliminary evidence also suggests that Stat3 may be linked to diabetes.

== Awards ==
In 2014, Yu received the Humboldt Research Award of the Alexander von Humboldt Foundation, granted to "academics, whose fundamental discoveries, new theories, or insights have had a significant impact on their own discipline and who are expected to continue producing cutting-edge achievements in the future."

In 2020, Yu received the Karla Mooers Pilot Study Awardof the Rivkin Center for Ovarian Cancer Research for her work on PARG inhibitors as a potential treatment for ovarian cancer. This research explores how PARG inhibitors activate the immune system to attack cancer cells, with the goal of improving treatment outcomes for ovarian cancer patients.
