= Binghui Shen =

American radiobiologist

Binghui Shen (born 1961), is an American radiobiologist. He is currently the Chair and Professor of Cancer Genetics and Epigenetics at City of Hope National Medical Center.

He graduated BSc from Department of Biology of Zhejiang University in Hangzhou in 1983. From 1983 to 1986, Shen was an assistant in the Department of Agricultural Sciences at Zhejiang Agricultural University (previous and current Zhejiang University). Shen obtained his PhD from Kansas State University. Shen did his postdoctoral research first in the Department of Molecular Biology and Biochemistry at the University of California, Irvine, then in the Life Sciences Division of Los Alamos National Laboratory, New Mexico.

In 1996, Shen joined the Division of Cell & Tumor Biology at City of Hope National Medical Center. In 2000, he became associate professor in the Division of Molecular Medicine. In 2003, Shen was appointed the Director of the Division of Radiation Biology. He's also the Associated Chair and Professor in the Division of Cancer Biology, and a full member of Cancer Biology Program in the Comprehensive Cancer Center.

Shen was elected to the American Association for the Advancement of Science, the American Society of Radiation Research, and is member of the Radiation Study Section of the National Institutes of Health. Shen was named the United States Department of Defense’s 2002 Breast Cancer Research Program panel.
