= Saswati Chatterjee =

Virologist and professor

- Education: McGill University; Cell, Molecular Biology & Immunology
- Known for: Research of AAV-vectors in Gene Expression
- Awards: Fogarty NIH Visiting Fellowship, Mayo Foundation Fellowship, Medical Research Council Post Doctoral Fellowship, McGill University Faculty of Medicine Graduate Student Award, Arthur W. Ham Graduate Student Award - Canadian Federation of Biological Societies, J.W. McConnell Scholarship in Science & Engineering
- Scientific career
- Fields: Virology
- Institutions: City of Hope

Saswati Chatterjee is a virologist working as a professor at the Los Angeles City of Hope National Medical Center in the research department. Some of the viral areas she researches are: stem cells, gene therapy, genome editing, and parvovirus. Her main and current area of research is using Adeno-Associated Virus Vectors (AAV-Vectors). Additionally, she has had a role in many publications (see publications).

== Education and training ==
Chatterjee received her B.Sc. in Cell & Molecular Biology from McGill University in Montreal, Canada. She continued on at McGill and received her Ph.D. in Immunology.

== Research contributions ==
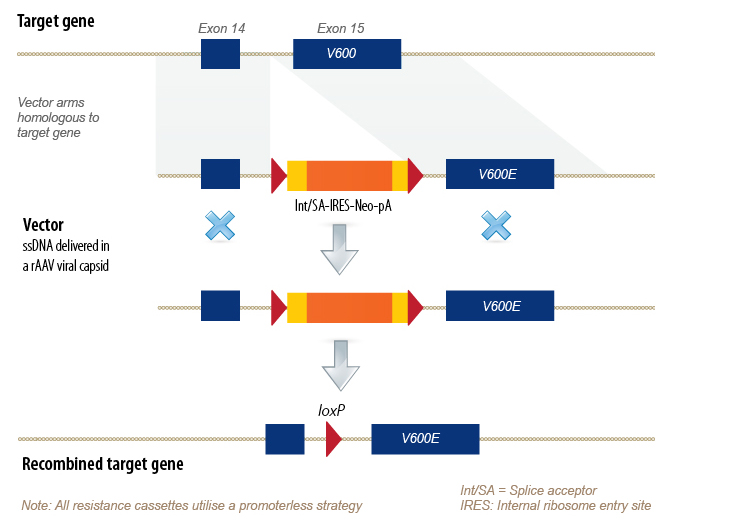
Targeting-vectors-2005-onwards

Adeno-Associated Virus vectors can be used for stem cell gene therapy. Adenovirus' have a Baltimore classification of level I, meaning that they have a liner dsDNA genome within an icosahedral nucleocapsid. Some of their advantages as vectors are that they are considered to be efficient at gene delivery and can infect nondividing cells. Other disadvantages are that adeno-associated viruses are immunogenic, high toxicity and have a small packaging limit.

One of Chatterjee's most notable publications is from 1999, and she researched the use of a "single stranded AAV, replication-defective nonpathogenic human parvovirus with a 4.7kb DNA genome with a palindromic inverted terminal repeats" This process REQUIRES the use of an adenovirus for the DNA to enter the cell and cause infection, thus being stably integrated into the cells DNA genome in a specific place. This study showed that the AAV vector was successful at efficiently transferring DNA into nondividing cells. Another publication that Chatterjee researched and featured in, regarded the effective transduction of CD34+ cells. They found that AAV transduction gave way to altered viral chromosomal integration.

== Awards and honors ==
- Fogarty NIH Visiting Fellowship
- Mayo Foundation Fellowship
- Medical Research Council Post Doctoral Fellowship
- McGill University Faculty of Medicine Graduate Student Award
- Member, Gene Therapy & Inborn Errors Review Group
- Member, Editorial Board, Human Gene Therapy

== Publications ==
Chatterjee has made contributions in 38 publications, on many of which she has been the lead researcher and author. Some of her best known publications are listed here.

- Chatterjee, S; Johnson, PR; Wong, KK (1992). "Dual target inhibition of HIV-1 in vitro with an adeno-associated virus-based antisense vector". Science. 258 (5087): 1485–1488. doi:10.1126/science.1359646. PMID 1359646.
- Podsakoff, GM; Wong, KK; Chatterjee, S (1994). "Stable and efficient gene transfer into non-dividing cells by adeno-associated virus-based vectors". J. Virol. 68 (9): 5656–5666. doi:10.1128/JVI.68.9.5656-5666.1994. PMC 236967. PMID 8057446.
- Fisher-Adams, G; Wong, KK; Podsakoff, GM; Forman, S; Chatterjee, S (1996). "Integration of adeno-associated virus vector genomes in human CD34 cells following transduction". Blood. 88: 492–504. doi:10.1182/blood.V88.2.492.bloodjournal882492.
- Chatterjee, S; Li, W; Wong, C; Lu, D; Fisher-Adams, G; Guha, M; Macer, J; Forman, S; Wong, KK (1999). "Transduction of primitive human marrow and cord blood-derived hematopoietic progenitor cells with adeno-associated virus vector". Blood. 93 (6): 1882–1894. doi:10.1182/blood.V93.6.1882.406k03_1882_1894. PMID 10068661.
- Sun, J; Krouse, RS; Forman, SJ; Senitzer, D; Sniecinski, I; Chatterjee, S; Wong, KK (2002). "Immunogenicity of a p210BCR-ABL fusion domain candidate DNA vaccine targeted to dendritic cells by an rAAV vector in vitro". Cancer Research. 62: 3175–3183.
- Sun, J; Senitzer, D; Forman, SJ; Chatterjee, S; Wong Jr, K.K. (2003). "Identification of New MHC Restriction Elements for Presentation of the p210BCR-ABL Fusion Region to Human Cytotoxic T Lymphocytes". Cancer Immunol Immunother. 52 (12): 761–70. doi:10.1007/s00262-003-0415-6. PMC 11032871. PMID 14564482. S2CID 32119538.
- Wong, KK; Chatterjee, S (2005). "Vaccine Development for Chronic Myelogenous Leukemia". Lancet. 365 (9460): 631–632. doi:10.1016/s0140-6736(05)17957-4. PMID 15721455. S2CID 30132029.
- Li, XJ, Chyu, KY, Dimayuga P, Yano J, Ferreira C, Ji A, Wang L, Cercek B, Chatterjee S, Shah PK. "One single IM injection of recombinant adeno-associated virus encoding ApoA-I-Mllano gene reduces aortic atherosclerosis and modulates the inflammatory phenotype of vein graft lesions in ApoE(-/-) mice" Circulation 2005; 112:U163-U164.
- Santat, L; Paz, H; Wong, C; Li, LJ; Macer, J; Forman, S; Wong, KK; Chatterjee, S (2005). "Recombinant AAV2 transduction of primitive human hematopoietic stem cells capable of serial engraftment in immune-deficient mice". Proceedings of the National Academy of Sciences of the United States of America. 102 (31): 11053–11058. Bibcode:2005PNAS..10211053S. doi:10.1073/pnas.0502902102. PMC 1182430. PMID 16043711.
