= Leslie Bernstein =

American epidemiologist (1939–2022)

Leslie Bernstein (October 9, 1939 – July 28, 2022) was an American cancer epidemiologist and biostatistician. Known particularly for her research on breast cancer, in 1994 Bernstein led a ground-breaking study that found a correlation between moderate exercise and breast cancer risk reduction. Bernstein received many awards for her research, including from the American Association for Cancer Research, and was described as the "mother of cancer epidemiology" by City of Hope.

== Personal life and education ==
Bernstein was born on 9 October 1939 in Long Beach, California. During her youth, she was a nationally ranked swimmer. She graduated from Hughes Junior High in Long Beach and started her studies at the University of California, Los Angeles at the age of 16, earning an undergraduate degree in mathematics in 1959, having initially hoped to become a statistician.

When she was 18, she married Saul Bernstein, a physical education student who had similar aspirations to work in medicine. Recognising they could not afford to pay two sets of tuition fees, Bernstein paused her studies to raise their children while her husband trained as a paediatric orthopaedic surgeon. During the Vietnam War, Bernstein's husband was drafted, and the family relocated to Kansas and subsequently Georgia, where he treated wounded soldiers. They later spent a period of time in the United Kingdom, where Bernstein's husband completed his medical fellowship.

After a 17-year break, Bernstein resumed her studies at the age of 36 at the University of Southern California. She went on to obtain a master's degree in gerontology in 1978 and a PhD in biometry in 1981, at the age of 41.

Bernstein was married until her husband's death in 2010, and they had three children together. Bernstein died on July 28, 2022, at the age of 82.

== Career and research ==
After receiving her PhD in 1981, Bernstein worked as a researcher and professor at the USC Keck School of Medicine for 25 years, before officially retiring in 2007. She went on to serve as the director of the cancer aetiology at the Beckman Research Institute City of Hope, a cancer research and treatment centre.

During her career, Bernstein led several ground-breaking studies. In 1994, she identified that people could reduce their risks of developing breast cancer through moderate exercise, becoming the first researcher to highlight the links between exercise and cancer survival. In 2017, Bernstein participated in a study that found the use of low-dose aspirin could reduce the risk of developing breast cancer in women. In addition to her breast cancer research, Bernstein also contributed to research on other forms of cancer, including non-Hodgkin lymphoma and oesophageal cancer, as well as into the long-term impact of cancer treatments on survivors.

Alongside Jonine Bernstein, Bernstein worked on the twenty-year Women's Environmental Cancer and Radiation Epidemiology (WECARE) study, which was the largest study of genetic susceptibility and risk for second primary breast cancer in women already diagnosed with the disease. In 1995, she co-founded the California Teachers Study, a cohort of 133,479 female public school professionals, which studied the impact of health behaviours on disease development through completing regular questionnaires with participants. Bernstein served as the California Teachers Study's Principal Investigator between 2006 and 2016.

Bernstein joined the American Association for Cancer Research in 1996, and served as a council member for its Women in Cancer Research group from 2011 until 2013. She also worked closely with the National Breast Cancer Coalition as a proponent for patient advocacy. Her additional support of the NBCC included joining them in testifying before Congress, and taking part in work to dispel myths around abortion being a cause of breast cancer.

== Recognition ==
In recognition of her cancer prevention research, Bernstein received the AACR–Prevent Cancer Foundation Award for Excellence in Cancer Prevention Research in 2007, and the AACR–American Cancer Society Award for Research Excellence in Cancer Epidemiology and Prevention in 2018. She also received recognition the Abraham Lilienfeld Award for Lifetime Contributions to Epidemiology, in addition to awards from the San Antonio Breast Cancer Symposium, the American Society for Preventative Oncology, and the University of Southern California.

Bernstein also received recognition for her prominence as a woman in science, as well as for her commitment to mentoring female students, researchers, and faculty members throughout her career. For this, she received City of Hope's Lifetime Achievement Mentoring Award, as well as the Rosalind E. Franklin Award for Women in Science.
