= Ravi Salgia =

Indian-born American medical scientist

- Born: 1960 (age 65–66); Indore, India
- Citizenship: American
- Education: Loyola University of Chicago
- Spouse: Deborah Ann Salgia
- Children: 3
- Scientific career
- Fields: Oncology
- Workplaces: Johns Hopkins University; Harvard Medical School; Dana–Farber Cancer Institute; Brigham and Women's Hospital; University of Chicago; City of Hope National Medical Center

Ravi Salgia (born 1960) is a translational thoracic oncologist, clinician/scientist, and academician.

== Biography and career ==
Salgia is the Arthur & Rosalie Kaplan Endowed Chair of Medical Oncology at City of Hope National Medical Center in Duarte, California. He also serves as associate director for Clinical Sciences at City of Hope National Medical Center. Prior to joining City of Hope, he served as tenured professor of medicine, Pathology and Dermatology, Director of the Thoracic Oncology Program and the Aerodigestive Tract Program Translational Research Lab in the section of Hematology/Oncology, Vice Chair for Translational Research in the Department of Medicine and associate director for Translational Science at the University of Chicago Comprehensive Cancer Center in Chicago.

During his fellowship in Professor James Griffin's laboratory at Harvard, Salgia worked on the cytoskeleton, signal transduction pathways and hematpoiesis/Chronic myelogenous leukemia. He was the first to fully clone the focal adhesion protein paxillin (human and chicken) and demonstrate its role in oncogenic transformation. As an independent clinician-scientist, Salgia's major research interests include elucidating how the receptor tyrosine kinases affect cell growth, and understanding tumor heterogeneity, including the role of cell-signaling pathways, mitochondria, immunology, and mathematical modeling

Salgia was born in Indore, Madhya Pradesh, India. He earned his undergraduate degree summa cum laude in mathematics, biology, and chemistry, minor in physics and then his medical degree and Ph.D. in biochemistry and biophysics from Loyola University of Chicago. There he also completed a fellowship in neurochemistry and physiology. He continued his postgraduate training with an internship and residency in internal medicine at the Johns Hopkins Hospital in Baltimore, followed by a fellowship in medical oncology at Dana–Farber Cancer Institute in Boston, during which time he also served as a clinical fellow at Harvard Medical School in Boston.

Salgia has been married to Deborah A. Salgia since 1990 and they have three children.
