= Morris Verger =

American architect

- Born: March 25, 1915; Fort Worth, Texas
- Died: July 11, 1999 (aged 84); Los Angeles, California
- Occupation: Architect
- Buildings: City of Hope National Medical Center; Terman Engineering Center; Frank D. Lanterman High School

Morris David Verger (March 25, 1915 – July 11, 1999) was an architect from Los Angeles, California. He was named a Fellow of the American Institute of Architects and was president of the Southern California chapter of the American Institute of Architects in 1975 and of the group's California council in 1980. His private residence and another private residence, both in Westwood, are both registered as Los Angeles City Historic Places.

== Personal life ==
Verger was born in Fort Worth, Texas, the son of Dora and Joseph Verger. He graduated from the University of California, Berkeley, in 1943 and thereafter entered the U.S. Navy as a naval architect stationed in San Diego until the end of World War II.

He married his wife, Florence, in 1939. Their son, Paul, was born in 1945, and daughter, Alice, in 1949. Florence was a business teacher and was active in architectural charities. Verger's younger brother, Ephraim Baran, was one of three co-founders of RBB Architects, one of America's largest architecture firms dedicated to the design of health care institutions.

Verger served as president of the Los Angeles County and State of California chapters of the American Institute of Architects. He became a Fellow of the American Institute of Architects in 1974. He has a long collaboration and friendship with psychologist and systems analyst Elias Porter on the application of relationship theories in architectural and urban planning.

== Career ==
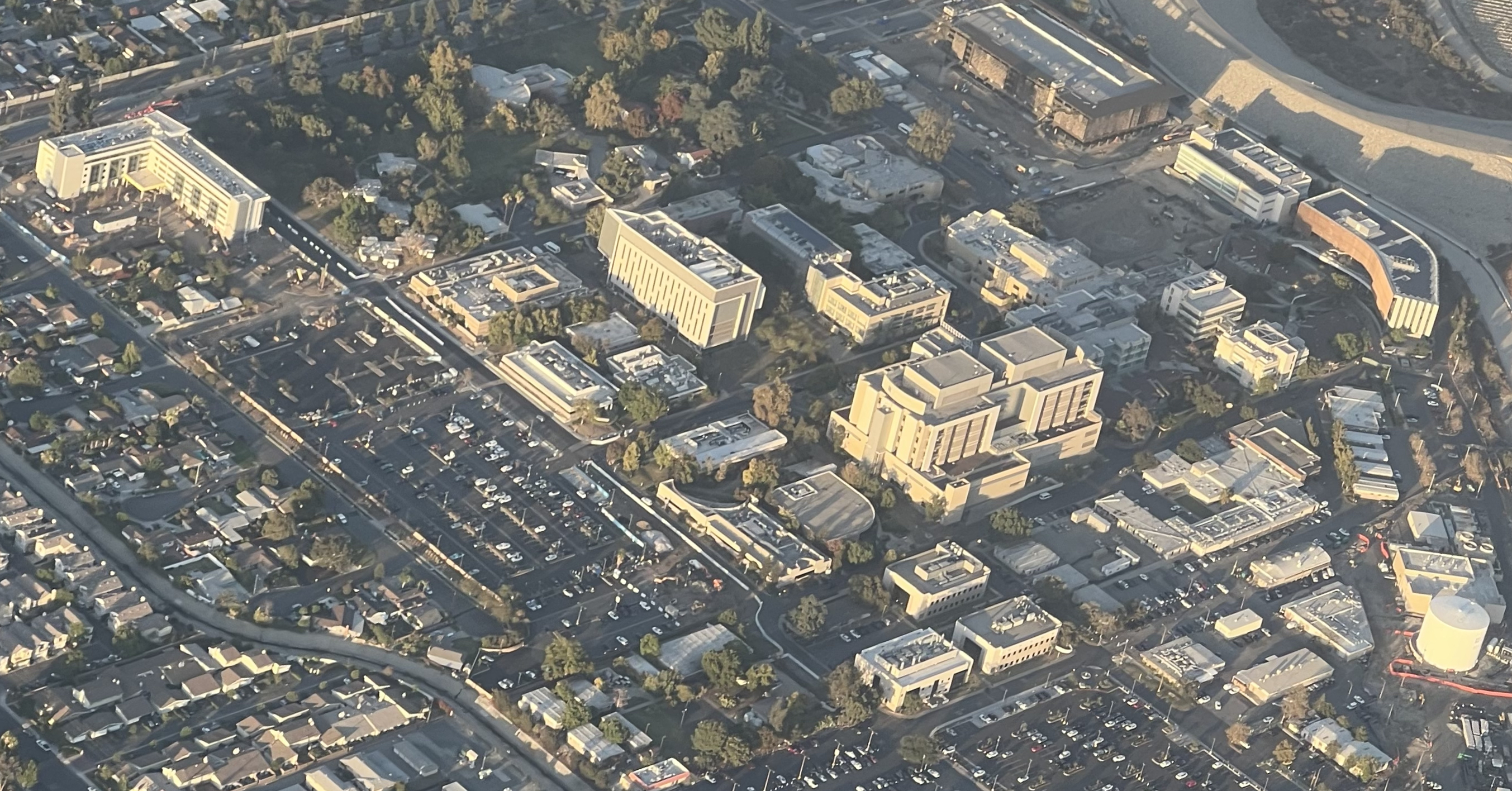
Aerial view of City of Hope campus in 2021

Verger began his solo practice in 1951. He was known for a wide body of work. Some of his larger projects are the City of Hope National Medical Center in Duarte and the Terman Engineering Center of Stanford University. He also designed the Frank D. Lanterman High School, a facility designed for mentally and physically handicapped persons. He designed many commercial office buildings for professionals, including the Dwan Gallery-Flax Art complex in Westwood Village. The interior was modeled after Frank Lloyd Wright's V.C. Morris Gift Shop building in San Francisco, California.

Verger's own self-designed Westwood neighborhood house on Comstock Avenue is a registered as an historic place in the City of Los Angeles. The Historic Commission describes it as an "Excellent example of Mid-Century Modern residential architecture." This home was featured in the June 1955 issue of American Builder. Additionally, a neighboring residence on Comstock also designed by Verger is also a registered Los Angeles City historic place.

Verger advocated creating commercial and institutional architecture that reflects and respects the needs and desires of the people who would be commonly using it. He wrote in L.A. Architect in March 1975:

I believe architecture is partially intangible. It cannot be adequately measured by the dollar and cents of the marketplace, by the sociologist's statistics, or by political expediency. The intangible measures of architecture are the aesthetic qualities that reach the individual's values and give him a recognizable and positive sense of relationship to his surroundings. Structural and functional adequacy, economic feasibility, and community acceptance are all parts of architecture and are the intangible elements.

In a later interview Verger stated:

The architect must personally speak with the community -- and show the community that if they express their values, the architect can design an environment which will help the community live according to their standards and values. It's a teaching/learning process on both sides.

Verger was also known for his systems theory concept of "Connective Planning," the process of gathering the input of all potential users into the planning and building process. He opposed the idea of the architect imposing his will on the inhabitants and invitees of buildings, an unusual viewpoint in his time for commercial projects. He collaborated with psychologist Elias Porter from 1961 to Porter's death in 1987 in the refining of "Connective Planning" into the "Multiple Channel Communication," a method of planning architecture and spaces with the input of the ultimate users.

Verger's first application of Connective Planning was the Dwan Gallery-Flax Art complex. He wrote in 1994 in his book Connective Planning:

The earliest application of Connective Planning was in the design of Flax Artist Materials in Los Angeles, a retail art supply store...What was needed was a common context that integrated the points of view of the customer, the employee, and the owner. Because of this, and because Flax's goal was visionary, the conventional planning that usually went into the design of a retail store clearly would not suffice...The participants in the planning included Harvey Flax, employees, and customers. After verifying that the others understood Mr. Flax's purpose and beliefs, the facilitator spent several days informally questioning employees and customers. Multiple Channel Communication had not yet been developed, but the statements of all participants were compiled and sorted into order of priority. The information of priorities enabled the facilitator to develop, and then as architect to design, a plan for the store that respected the varying views on what was necessary to achieve the goal. The store met the owner's goals of expressing respect for creativity and recognizing the value of art in the community.

Los Angeles Times urban design critic Sam Hall Kaplan wrote “It was an interesting comment on architecture at a time when many designers feel compelled to express themselves at the expense of the users and neighbors. That Verger did not succumb to that compulsion deserves praise, as does his design.”
