= Tsai-Fan Yu =

American medical academic

- Born: 1911; Shanghai, China
- Died: March 2, 2007 (aged 95); New York City, New York, US
- Education: Ginling College; Peking Union Medical College
- Known for: Research on gout
- Scientific career
- Fields: Medicine
- Workplaces: Mount Sinai School of Medicine; Columbia University College of Physicians and Surgeons

Tsai-Fan Yu (Chinese: 郁采蘩; pinyin: Yù Cǎifán; Wade–Giles: Yü Ts'ai-fan, 1911 – March 2, 2007) was a Chinese-American physician, researcher, and the first woman to be appointed as a full professor at Mount Sinai School of Medicine. She helped to develop an explanation for the cause of gout and experimented with early drugs to treat the disease which are still in use today.

== Early life and education ==
Yu was born in Shanghai, China in 1911. At age 13, her mother died and her father worked three jobs to help support her educational ambitions. As a sophomore at Ginling College in China, Yu was admitted into Peking Union Medical College on full scholarship and received her medical degree with highest honors in 1939. In the same year, Yu became the Chief Resident in Internal Medicine at Peking Union Medical College.

== Career and research ==
While in China, Yu researched the various diseases found in citrus fruits and beans. Yu came to New York in 1947 and became a U.S. citizen in 1950. She taught at Columbia University College of Physicians and Surgeons until joining the staff faculty at Mount Sinai Medical Center in 1957 where she would spend the rest of her career. In 1973, Yu became the first female to be appointed as a full professor at Mount Sinai Hospital, one of the oldest and largest teaching hospitals in The United States.

=== Causes of Gout ===
Yu conducted extensive research in which was continuously funded by the National Institutes of Health for 26 years. She began studying renal function in various diseases such as Wilson's disease before focusing her research on gout at Mount Sinai. Yu helped to establish an understanding of the metabolic relationship between elevated levels of uric acid and the pain experienced by gout patients. She aimed to classify and determine the differences the various forms of gout, such as acute gouty arthritis and chronic tophaceuous gout. Yu also studied the effect that other medication conditions have on the presentation of gout. She found that about half of the patients with gout have other associated medication conditions, including hypertension, proteinuria, diabetes, and hyperlipidemia.

=== Treatment of Gout ===
Beginning in the 1950s, Yu developed medicines that have been proven to be successful for treating gout. In addition, Yu and her colleague Alexander B. Gutman helped to establish a groundbreaking clinic at Mount Sinai for the treatment of gout, one of the first gout clinics in the United States at Mount Sinai. Yu studied probenecid, a uricosuric drug which causes the removal of excess uric acid by being excreted with urine. She later conducted a five-year study that was published in 1961 in which she discovered colchicine, an anti-inflammatory drug that prevents recurring attacks of acute gout. In 1953, Yu conducted research on phenylbutazone as a treatment for various arthritic disorders, one being acute gouty arthritis. She and colleagues found that phenylbutazone injections lead to significantly higher urate clearance and more efficient excretion, making it successful in treating acute gout. In the 1960s, Yu further developed studies of gout’s mechanisms and soon discovered allopurinol, a drug that helps to prevent the formation of uric acid and is used in treating gout and kidney stones. In 1980, she studied carprofen and its effect on urinary excretion. She found it was effective for treating acute gouty arthritis and recommended further trials. While at Mount Sinai Hospital, Yu helped to establish one of the first systemized laboratory tests for diagnosing rheumatoid arthritis.

In 1972, Yu co-authored and published Gout and Uric Acid Metabolism and in 1982, she published the book called The Kidney in Gout and Hyperuricemia .

== Awards and honors ==
At age 81, Yu retired as the first female professor at Mount Sinai Hospital with professor Emeritus status in 1992. She was awarded the Distinguished Career Achievement Award from the Mount Sinai Medical Center. She was also awarded the Master Award from the American Association of Rheumatology for her work in diagnosing rheumatoid arthritis. In 2004, The Tsai-Fan Yu Foundation was established as a philanthropic nonprofit corporation. Over the course of her career, she worked with over 4000 gout patients at one of the largest gout-focused practices. She also published 220 scientific journal articles and is known for her ability to translate lab research into an effective treatment for patients. She is aunt to Hua Eleanor Yu, a professor in tumor immunotherapy and Humboldt Research Award recipient. Yu died at age 95 in March 2007 due to respiratory complications at Mount Sinai Medical Center in Manhattan.

== See also ==
- Timeline of women in science
