= Edward Shanbrom =

Edward Shanbrom (November 29, 1924 – February 20, 2012) was an American medical researcher and hematologist, best known for the development of the process allowing the clotting protein Factor VIII to be made to treat hemophilia.

== Early life and education ==
Edward Shanbrom was born in West Haven, Connecticut, United States, and served in the United States Navy from 1943 to 1946. He then received a Bachelor of Science from Allegheny College, and a medical degree from the University of Buffalo School of Medicine. Following an internship for the Buffalo University Hospital, Shanbrom received a fellowship to Yale University, where he studied hematology. After the fellowship, he served Orange County General Hospital, St. Joseph Hospital, and City of Hope Medical Center. During that time he was a clinical instructor at the UCLA School of Medicine and University of California, Irvine School of Medicine.

== Developments ==
Working at the Hyland division of Baxter Laboratories, he helped to develop a new method of producing Factor VIII, a clotting protein, that could be directly used for treatment of bleeding and joint pain in hemophiliacs by injection. Shanbrom left Hyland in the mid-1970s to pursue research at his home, developing a blood cleaning process using detergents to scrub the fatty coating of viruses. In 1988, the New York Blood Center bought his patented processes for inactivation of viruses in transfusion blood.

== Philanthropy and legacy ==
Shanbrom gave through The Shanbrom Family Foundation as well as the Edward and Helen Shanbrom Family Fund of the Orange County Community Foundation. He received awards from the American Board of Internal Medicine, National Board of Medical Examiners, National Hemophilia Foundation, University of Buffalo, and an honorary doctorate from Allegheny College. He was a member of the American Association for Cancer Research and the American Society of Hematology. In 2007 the Edward Shanbrom, M.D. Hall was dedicated on the UC Irvine campus in recognition of his hematology research and support of the university, as well as Edward Shanbrom, M.D. Laboratory for the Study of Blood and Natural Products.
