= Beckman Research Institute =

American medical research institute founded 1984

Coordinates: 34.129922°N 117.970729°W

Beckman Research Institute of City of Hope
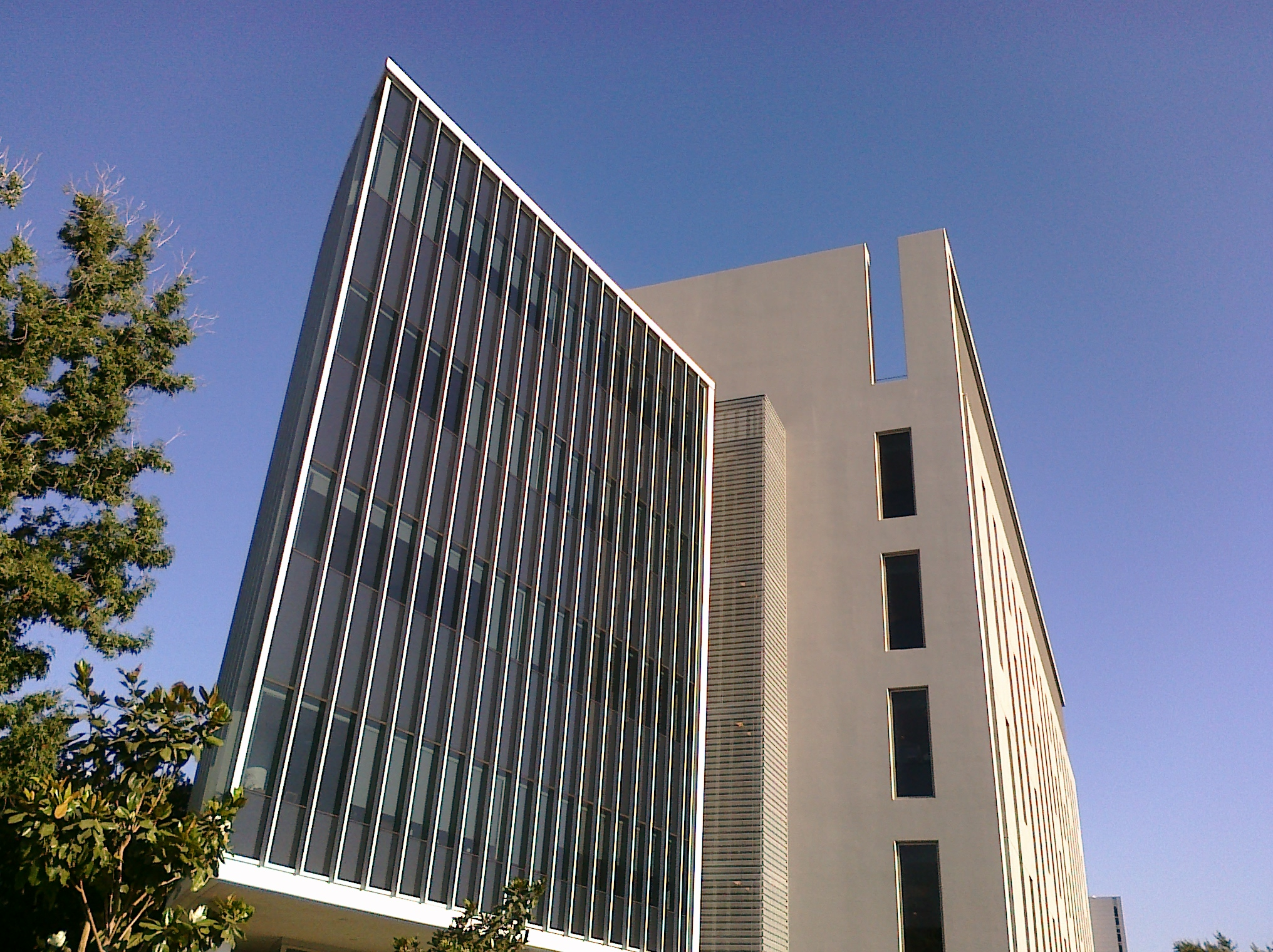
- Beckman Research Institute at City of Hope
- Established: 1984
- Field of research: Cancer Biology, Cancer Immunotherapeutics & Tumor Immunology, Diabetes and Metabolic Diseases Research, Immunology, Molecular and Cellular Biology, Molecular Medicine, Molecular Pharmacology, Neurosciences, Virology
- Director: John Carpten, Ph.D.
- Location: Duarte, California
- Affiliations: City of Hope National Medical Center

The Beckman Research Institute of City of Hope (BRI) is a not-for-profit medical research facility located at and partnering with the City of Hope National Medical Center in Duarte, California, United States. It is dedicated to studying normal and abnormal biological processes which may be related to cancer, diabetes, HIV/AIDS and other life-threatening diseases. Both basic and clinical research are carried out in cooperation with the City of Hope National Medical Center. The institute itself is organized into more than 20 departments and divisions. As of 2021, the director is Steven T. Rosen. The Beckman Research Institute also hosts the Irell & Manella Graduate School of Biological Sciences whose founding dean was Arthur Riggs.

== History ==
City of Hope was founded by the Jewish Consumptive Relief Association as a tuberculosis sanatorium, the Los Angeles Sanatorium, in 1913. As tuberculosis was increasingly controlled by use of antibiotics, executive director Samuel H. Golter proposed that the institution expand to become a national medical center studying other diseases. City of Hope's Cancer Research Institute was dedicated in 1952. Since then, the research scope has continued to expand, with cancer and diabetes as major foci, as well as other life-threatening diseases. In 1983, a major challenge grant of $10 million from the Arnold and Mabel Beckman Foundation enabled the research division of the City of Hope to undergo significant expansion and officially create the Beckman Research Institute. Funds were available for buildings, equipment, and endowment, but had to support research and the advancement of knowledge related to the "causes, prevention, and cure of human disease". The Beckman Research Institute at City of Hope was the first of five Beckman research institutes to receive funding in the United States.

=== Directors ===
- Joseph T. Holden (1983–1993)
- John Steven Kovach (1993–2000)
- Arthur Riggs (2000–2007)
- Richard Jove (2008–2012)
- David Horne, (2012–2014, interim director)
- Steven T. Rosen (2014–2023)
- John Carpten (2023-)

== Research contributions ==
Research and treatment are closely coordinated between the City of Hope National Medical Center and the Beckman Research Institute. As of 2019, over 300 clinical trials were being conducted at any one time, and at least one-third of eligible patients were enrolled in clinical trials. A number of significant achievements have been reported by researchers affiliated with the Beckman Research Institute at City of Hope. These include:

=== Diabetes ===
Researchers associated with the Beckman Research Institute are credited with starting the biotechnology industry. Keiichi Itakura and Arthur Riggs, with Genentech scientist Herbert Boyer, were the first to develop human recombinant gene products. Their techniques were used to successfully create synthetic somatostatin in E. coli, the first expression of a human protein in bacteria, in 1977. The techniques and tools of genetic synthesis were standardizable and applicable to many similar problems. The group successfully reported the expression of human insulin in bacteria by 1978.

Barry Forman identified the first new steroid-like hormone in 30 years, androstanol, a hormone with a different mechanism of action from others, that may be useful in treatment of diabetes.

Fouad Kandeel leads clinical trials testing the use of islet transplantation to treat patients who are incapacitated by severe type 1 diabetes.

Bart Roep leads immune intervention strategies (including gene therapy, stem cell therapy and bone marrow transportation) with the ultimate goal to cure type 1 diabetes.

=== Cancer ===
Arthur Riggs went on to work with Shmuel Cabilly on "fundamental technology required for the artificial synthesis of antibody molecules", since used to create "smart" cancer drugs. Riggs has been associated with the institute in several ways, including as director of the Beckman Research Institute from 2000 to 2007, now director emeritus.

Gerd Pfeifer was able to prove a definitive link between smoking and lung cancer, by demonstrating genetic damage in lung cells, caused by a chemical in cigarette smoke.

The Beckman Research Institute has partnered with the Dr. Susan Love Research Foundation in the Health of Women Study (HOW), a long-term cohort study tracking the health of women via online and mobile platforms. It will study both women who have and who do not have breast cancer. The Dr. Susan Love Research Foundation hopes to recruit one million women volunteers to become part of its participating "Army of Women".

Hua Eleanor Yu and her group are studying the involvement of STAT3 with cancer cells and the immune system, and developing possible drug treatments to attack tumor cells.

=== HIV/AIDS ===
John Rossi has worked on treatments for AIDS-related lymphoma, pancreatic cancer and liver cancer. He was the first researcher to use RNA to block the progress of the virus that causes HIV/AIDS by degrading the HIV virus within infected cells. He is involved in ongoing work with David DiGiusto and others to develop disease-resistant immune systems by transplanting gene-modified HIV-1-resistant stem and progenitor cells. With John Zaia and others, Rossi has worked on Lentiviral vectors for delivering RNA-based gene therapy. This approach combines stem cell and gene therapy to deliver RNA molecules that can block the genes that the HIV/AIDS virus uses to infect immune cells. John Zaia is also investigating the possibility that cancer chemotherapy can perturb reservoirs of HIV, which has relevance to therapeutic interventions to cure HIV.

== Recognition ==
As of December 2011, CharityWatch rated the Beckman Research Institute of City of Hope as an "A−" grade charity.

== See also ==
- Beckman Institute for Advanced Science and Technology at the University of Illinois at Urbana–Champaign
- Irell & Manella Graduate School of Biological Sciences at City of Hope National Medical Center
