= Thomas C. Chalmers =

American physician (1917-1995)

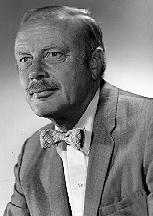
- Born: December 8, 1917; New York City
- Died: December 27, 1995; Lebanon, New Hampshire
- Education: Columbia University College of Physicians and Surgeons
- Occupations: Physician, professor
- Employer: Mount Sinai School of Medicine
- Known for: Research into randomized controlled trial and meta-analysis methodology in medical research
- Title: President, Dean
- Spouse: Frances Talcott
- Children: Thomas C. Chalmers; Richard M. Chalmers; Elizabeth Chalmers Wright; Frances Talcott Chalmers-Smith

Thomas Clark Chalmers (December 8, 1917, New York City – December 27, 1995, Lebanon, New Hampshire) was famous for his role in the development of the randomized controlled trial and meta-analysis in medical research.

Chalmers began his higher education as an English major at Yale College. He obtained his medical degree from Columbia University College of Physicians and Surgeons in 1943. He spent one year as an intern at the NewYork-Presbyterian Hospital, and completed his residency at the Boston City Hospital.

Chalmers' interest in medical research began while working for the United States Army in Japan, where he conducted clinical trials investigating the treatment of hepatitis among Korean War soldiers. After returning to the United States, he spent 13 years as chief of medical services at Lemuel Shattuck Hospital in Boston. He also held academic positions at Tufts University School of Medicine and Harvard Medical School. From 1968 to 1973 he held a number of appointments in Washington, DC: assistant director at the United States Department of Veterans Affairs, followed by concurrent positions as associate director of the National Institutes of Health (NIH) and Director of the NIH Clinical Center.

From 1973 to 1983 he was president and dean of the Mount Sinai School of Medicine (MSSM). While at MSSM, he established the Department of Geriatrics (the first in the United States), and, following his commitment to the application of the scientific method and biostatistics to medical practice he established the Department of Biostatistics.

After leaving Mount Sinai, he became chairman of the board of directors of the Dartmouth-Hitchcock Medical Center, Lebanon, New Hampshire.

Chalmers was president of the American Association for the Study of Liver Disease (1959) and president of the American Gastroenterological Association (1969). In 1981, he was awarded the Jacobi Medallion by the Mount Sinai Alumni "for distinguished achievement in the field of medicine or extraordinary service to the Hospital, the School, or the Alumni."

Chalmers is known for his role in the retraction of a 1976 study by Mount Sinai researcher Arthur Langer, which had identified asbestos in common talc based products. Upon receiving pressure from executives from Johnson and Johnson (the major manufacturer of talc baby powder), he issued a retraction of Langer's work, stating: “It is the opinion of Mount Sinai’s Department of Pediatrics that baby talc is a useful and safe product.” This action is considered by some to have significantly deterred or delayed further inquiries into the presence of asbestos in talc products. It would later be revealed that the products had indeed contained asbestos, and the product would be linked to the numerous deaths in the US and abroad.

His papers were donated to the National Library of Medicine by the Thomas C. Chalmers Centre for Systematic Reviews. Since 1994 the Thomas C Chalmers MD award has been presented annually at the Cochrane Colloquium for the presentation which best addresses methodological issues related to systematic reviews and demonstrates originality of thought, high quality science, relevance for the advancement of the science of systematic reviews, and clarity of presentation.
