= City of Hope (organization) =

U.S. clinical research center and hospital

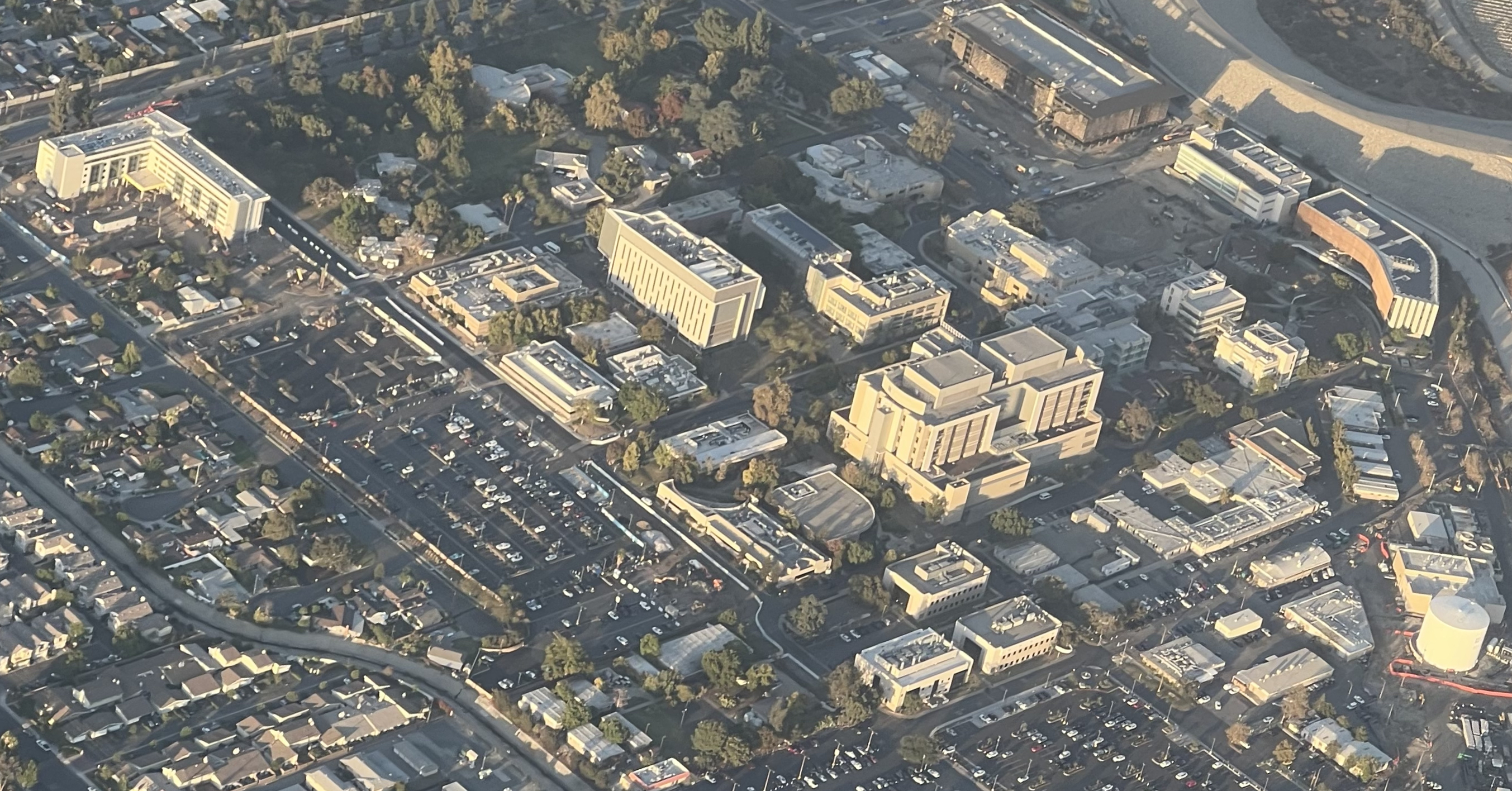
- Aerial view of City of Hope campus in 2021
- Formation: 1913
- Type: Nonprofit, charitable organization
- Purpose: Clinical research, medical treatment, education
- Headquarters: Duarte, California
- Location: United States
- Coordinates: 34.129634°N 117.970767°W
- Members: National Cancer Institute-designated Comprehensive Cancer Center, National Comprehensive Cancer Network
- President and CEO: Robert W. Stone
- Chief Scientific Officer, Beckman Institute Director, Cancer Center Director, Provost: John Carpten
- Affiliations: Association of Community Cancer Centers, National Bone Marrow Transplantation Research Network, National Gene Vector Laboratory, Southern California Islet Cell Consortium, Islet Cell Transplant Center, Juvenile Diabetes Research Foundation
- Website: www.cityofhope.org; www.cancercenter.com

City of Hope is a private, non-profit clinical research center and healthcare system headquartered in Duarte, California, United States. The center's main campus resides on 110 acres (45 ha) of land adjacent to the boundaries of Duarte and Irwindale, along with a network of locations in Southern California, Georgia, Arizona, and Illinois.

Major hospital centers include the City of Hope Helford Hospital in Duarte, California; the Cancer Specialty Hospital and Lennar Foundation Cancer Center in Irvine; and hospital locations in Newnan, Georgia; Zion, Illinois; and Goodyear, Arizona. They also operate the Beckman Research Institute and the Irell & Manella Graduate School of Biological Sciences.

A founding member of the National Comprehensive Cancer Network, City of Hope has been designated a Comprehensive Cancer Center by the National Cancer Institute. It is best known for cancer treatment and research. City of Hope has also been ranked one of the nation's Best Cancer Hospitals by U.S. News & World Report for over ten years. They have also recently been named to the Los Angeles Business Journal best places to work list for 2026.

== History ==
City of Hope - Duarte (Los Angeles County, California)

=== Los Angeles Sanatorium ===
In the late 19th and early 20th centuries, the spread of tuberculosis, also known as "consumption", was a growing concern in the United States and Europe. Owing to advancements in the scientific understanding of its contagious nature, a movement to house and quarantine sufferers became prevalent. Construction of tuberculosis sanatoria, including tent cities, became common in the United States, with many sanatoriums located in the Southwestern United States, where it was believed that the more arid climate would aid sufferers.

In 1913, the Jewish Consumptive Relief Association was chartered in Los Angeles, California, with the intent of raising money to establish a free, non-sectarian sanatorium for persons from throughout the United States diagnosed with tuberculosis. After raising sufficient funds, the association purchased 10 acres (4.0 ha) of land in Duarte, California, a small town in the more arid San Gabriel Valley, approximately 16 miles (26 km) east of downtown Los Angeles, and dubbed the property the Los Angeles Sanatorium. Opening January 11, 1914, the sanatorium originally consisted of two cottages made of canvas, one for patients and one for caregivers. The sanatorium admitted 31 patients in the first year. By the 1920s, the Sanatorium had over 30 buildings to house 120 patients.

The sanatorium was nicknamed "City of Hope", and grew in size for several decades, continuing to raise funds, construct permanent facilities, hire doctors and treat increasing numbers of patients. Treating tuberculosis remained the sanatorium's focus until after World War II, when antibiotics for tuberculosis were discovered.

=== Transition to healthcare system ===
With tuberculosis becoming less prevalent, executive sanatorium director Samuel H. Golter began an initiative in 1946 to transform the sanatorium into a full medical center, supported by a research institute and post-graduate education. The Los Angeles Sanatorium officially changed its name to City of Hope National Medical Center in 1949. City of Hope's research institute was formally established in 1952. The City of Hope Graduate School of Biological Sciences was eventually chartered in 1993, and changed its name to the Irell & Manella Graduate School of Biological Sciences in 2009.

From 1953 to 1985, under executive director Ben Horowitz, City of Hope grew further in size and became best known for its cancer research and treatment programs. Horowitz raised City of Hope's annual average operating budget from $600,000 to more than $100 million during his tenure.

City of Hope created the Frank L. Chance Research Fellowship Foundation in 1955.

Robert Russin won a commission to create the "Spirit of Life" fountain, which was officially dedicated in 1967. In 1972, Morris Verger, an architect, designed the National Medical Center in Duarte.

In 1981, the National Cancer Institute designated City of Hope a "Clinical Cancer Research Center". In 1983, the Arnold and Mabel Beckman Foundation awarded City of Hope a $10 million grant to establish the Beckman Research Institute of City of Hope; the Beckman Research Institute of City of Hope is now City of Hope's research moniker, and is one of six institutes/centers established by the Beckman Foundation in the United States.

In 2019, Paul Edmonds (patient), became the fifth person in the world to achieve remission for acute myelogenous leukemia and HIV after receiving a stem cell transplant at City of Hope.

City of Hope acquired Cancer Treatment Centers of America in 2022 and began operating the facilities as City of Hope in 2023.

== Research and treatment ==
City of Hope's goals are the prevention, treatment and cure of cancer and other life-threatening diseases, including diabetes and HIV/AIDS. As such, City of Hope's programs include the fields of brain, breast, gastrointestinal, gynecologic, thoracic and urologic cancers, as well as leukemia, lymphoma, and diabetes. City of Hope has been designated a Comprehensive Cancer Center by the National Cancer Institute, a branch of the National Institutes of Health.

City of Hope is a bench to bedside institution, with investments in basic, translational and clinical research. Faculty, residents and fellows conduct biomedical research, treat patients and educate medical professionals with the medical center serving as a teaching hospital.

Industrial, institutional, and National Cancer Institute-sponsored external peer-reviewed clinical trials are conducted at City of Hope.

=== Synthetic human insulin ===
In 1978, City of Hope researchers Arthur Riggs and Keiichi Itakura, working with Herbert Boyer of San Francisco–based biotechnology corporation Genentech, Inc., became the first scientists to produce synthetic human insulin. City of Hope licensed patents based on Riggs's and Itakura's work to Genentech. On August 13, 1999, City of Hope sued Genentech for allegedly cheating it out of its fair share of the profits from products based on the Riggs-Itakura patents. On April 24, 2008, the Supreme Court of California affirmed the jury's award of $300 million in contractual damages to City of Hope but reversed the award of $200 million in punitive damages.

=== Hematopoietic cell transplantation ===
On January 13, 2011, City of Hope performed its 10,000th hematopoietic stem cell transplantation, which includes transplants of bone marrow, peripheral blood stem cells collected by apheresis, and umbilical cord stem cells. By 2016, this has grown to over 13,000 stem cell transplants. By 2026, the center had performed 20,000 hematopoietic stem cell transplants.

=== Cancer research and treatment ===
City of Hope is a founding member of the National Comprehensive Cancer Network (NCCN), a non-profit alliance of 21 U.S. cancer centers. The NCCN publishes clinical practice guidelines for oncological treatment among its member institutions. Member institutions include City of Hope, The University of Texas MD Anderson Cancer Center, St. Jude Children's Research Hospital/University of Tennessee Cancer Institute, Fox Chase Cancer Center in Philadelphia, Pennsylvania, Fred Hutchinson Cancer Research Center in Seattle, Washington, and 16 others.

Since 2023, City of Hope has conducted clinical trials for AOH1996 for the treatment of solid tumors.

== Facilities ==
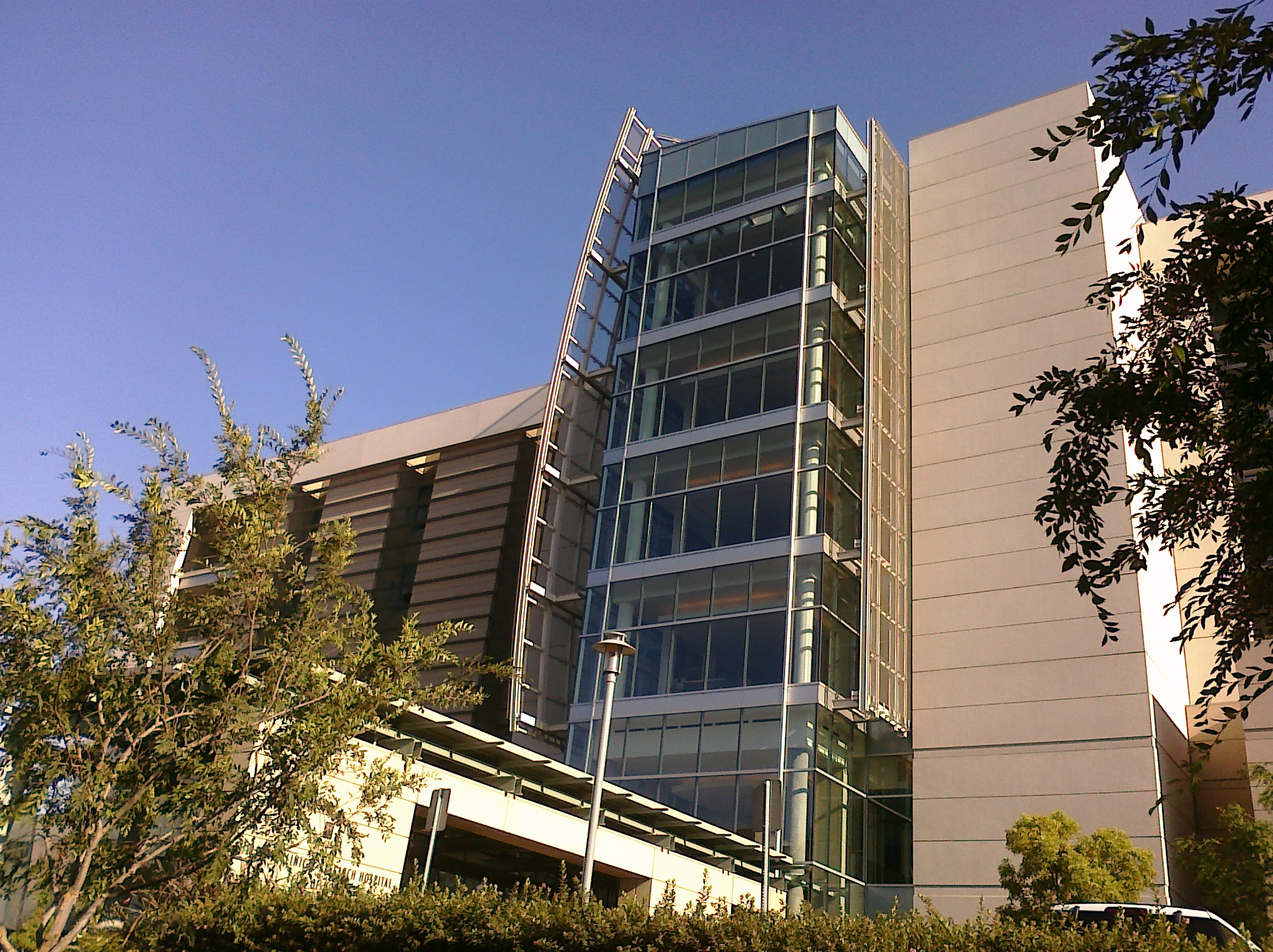
City of Hope Helford Clinical Research Hospital

City of Hope Center for Biomedicine & Genetics is a manufacturing facility specializing in the production of pharmaceutical-grade materials. The center also assists clinical investigators with translational research and clinical trials. The graduate school at City of Hope, Irell & Manella Graduate School of Biological Sciences, is housed within the Arnold and Mabel Beckman Center for Cancer Immunotherapeutics & Tumor Immunology.

=== Main campus and network ===
City of Hope's main campus in Duarte has several treatment facilities for inpatient and outpatient care, including the Helford Clinical Research Hospital, Michael Amini Transfusion Medicine Center, the Geri and Richard Brawerman Center for Ambulatory Care and the Women's Center. The Helford Hospital has 217 licensed beds. Southern California community practice clinics are located in Antelope Valley, Arcadia, Corona, Glendale, Glendora, Huntington Beach, Irvine Sand Canyon, Long Beach, Mission Hills, Newport Beach, Palmdale, Pasadena, Riverside, San Bernardino, Santa Clarita, Sherman Oaks, Simi Valley, South Bay, South Pasadena, Temecula, Thousand Oaks, Torrance, Upland, West Covina, West Hills and Wildomar.

=== Orange County campus ===
City of Hope is building a $200 million, six-story cancer hospital, which will anchor its Lennar Foundation Cancer Center in Irvine, in Orange County. The center is slated to open in 2025. City Of Hope Orange County Cancer Specialty Hospital opened around December 2025. In 2026, City of Hope partnered with other organizations on an art installation at South Coast Plaza. They also sponsored an art installation at a parking garage in Newport Beach, California.

=== Other locations ===
City of Hope has cancer treatment facilities in Georgia. They have a Cancer Center in Newnan, Georgia, City of Hope Atlanta. The site was originally Cancer Treatment Centers of America. The organization operates an outpatient care facility near Buckhead to better serve rural patients in Georgia. They announced an alliance with Union Regional Medical Center to expand cancer treatment in West Central Georgia. City of Hope has a cancer center and hospital that serves the greater Chicago area, located in Zion, Illinois. It was formerly affiliated with Cancer Treatment Centers of America.They have a regional cancer care network headquartered in Goodyear, Arizona. The center used to be affiliated with CTCA.

=== Beckman Research Institute of City of Hope ===
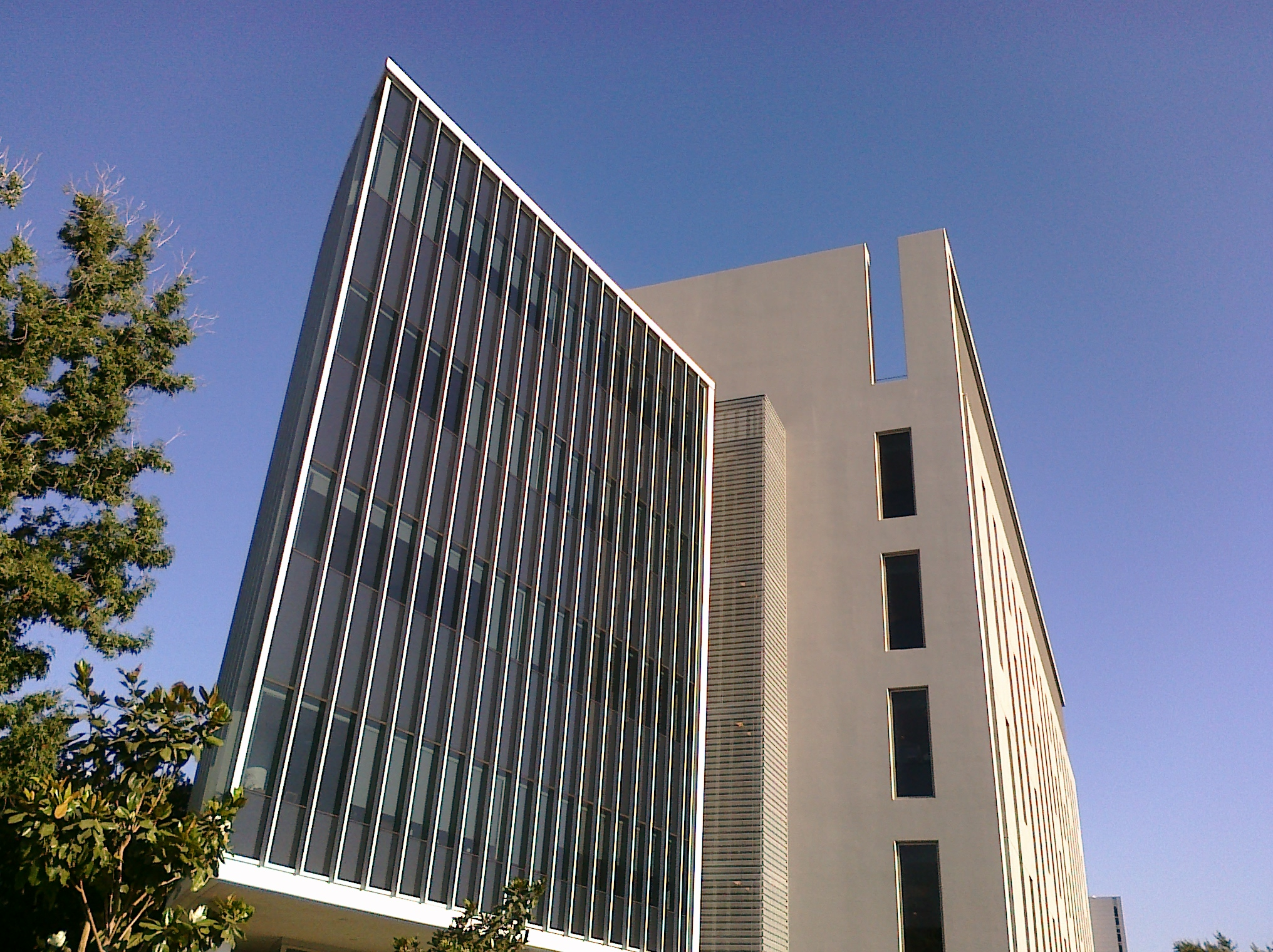
Beckman Research Institute at City of Hope

Beckman Research Institute of City of Hope is one of six research facilities established by funding from the Arnold and Mabel Beckman Foundation. Its primary focus is research in the areas of cancer, diabetes, and HIV/AIDS. The institute shelters the City of Hope Irell & Manella Graduate School of Biological Sciences.

Research conducted at the institute has contributed to discoveries in the areas of recombinant DNA technology, gene therapy and monoclonal antibodies.

== Notable doctors and researchers ==
=== Current ===
- Yuman Fong, Chair of the Department of Surgery
- Marcin Kortylewski, professor of immuno-oncology at the Beckman Research Institute
- Ravi Salgia, oncologist
- Hope Rugo, division chief of breast medical oncology
- Steven T. Rosen, administrator
- Binghui Shen, radiobiologist
- Keiichi Itakura, organic chemist
- Hua Eleanor Yu, cancer researcher
- Marshall Brucer, medical researcher
- Saswati Chatterjee, Virologist
- Mark E. Davis, chemical engineer

=== Former ===
- Charles Brenner (biochemist)
- David E. Comings, former chief of genetics
- Smita Bhatia, oncologist
- Samuel Rahbar, discovered linkage between diabetes and Hba1c
- Benjamin Djulbegovic, Professor from 2017 to 2023
- Leslie Bernstein, cancer epidemiologist and biostatistician
- Rick Kittles, geneticist
- Arthur Riggs (geneticist)
- Daniel J. Wallace, rheumatologist
- Ernest Beutler, Chairman of Medicine and hematologist
- Bruce Beutler, immunologist and geneticist
- Edward Shanbrom, hematologist
- Susumu Ohno, geneticist with specialty in molecular evolution
- Rachmiel Levine, Endocrinologist and Executive Medical Director

== Fundraising ==
City of Hope secures funding from a mixture of sources, including patient revenue, private donations, foundation support and federal research grants. They used to benefit from a celebrity softball game in Nashville, Tennessee. They host a Spirit of Life Gala. Annual fundraising events include Walk for Hope (a multi-city charity fundraising walk), and Music of Hope.

In 1968, Vicki Draves joined sprinter Jesse Owens, football player Tommy Harmon and race car driver Sam Hanks at the Sands Hotel in Las Vegas to help raise $700,000 for the City of Hope National Medical Center. In the 1980s, Joan Howard Maurer helped to raise funds for City of Hope by providing his autographs as incentives for donors to the facility in Duarte, California. Miley Cyrus is a supporter, having attended benefit concerts in 2008, 2009 and 2012.

The hospital also fundraises using giving days. In 2016, Doctors' Day allowed patients to thank doctors by giving in their name. More than $9000 was raised through 60 gifts. In 2017, City of Hope was planning a Bone Marrow Transplant Reunion Day and Survivors Day. The hospital also participates in #GivingTuesday. In 2015, the first time the hospital used the fundraiser, almost $120,000 were raised from 681 gifts. In 2016, those numbers rose to almost $200,000 from more than 1500 gifts. In January 2017 City of Hope received a donation of more than $50 million to establish the Wanek Family Project for Type 1 Diabetes at City of Hope.

=== Grants ===
==== National Cancer Institute grants ====
- Specialized Program of Research Excellence (SPORE) grant for translational research studies for Hodgkin and non-Hodgkin lymphoma – Five-year, $11.5 million.
- Grant to City of Hope's Division of Nursing Research for study of palliative care and quality-of-life concerns for lung cancer patients – Five-year, $13.4 million.
- Grant to City of Hope's Division of Cancer Etiology for the California Teachers Study, a survey of over 130,000 public school teachers and administrators to study the link between obesity, physical activity, hormone exposure and cancer – Three-year, $5 million.
- Grant to City of Hope's Department of Population Sciences to study genetic susceptibility for secondary malignancies as a result of treatment for cancer survivors – Five-year, $3.4 million.

=== Other grants and contracts ===
- California Institute for Regenerative Medicine (CIRM) grants for AIDS-related lymphoma and brain cancer research – $32.5 million.
- National Library of Medicine/National Institute of Diabetes and Digestive and Kidney Diseases grant to City of Hope's Department of Information Sciences to serve as coordinating center for distribution of islet cells and intestinal stem cells – $17 million.
- National Institute of Environmental Health Sciences grant to study ultraviolet light damage and its effect on mutagenesis – $2 million.
- Federal Community Project Funding Program, $1.98 million for HopeLLM program
- National Heart, Lung, and Blood Institute (NHLBI) contract to facilitate stem cell research from laboratory to clinical study; focus on development and manufacture of stem cell therapies—five-year, $8.6 million.

== Affiliations ==
City of Hope is affiliated with the following institutions:

- Association of Community Cancer Centers
- National Cancer Institute
- National Comprehensive Cancer Network (founding member)
- National Bone Marrow Transplantation Research Network (founding member)
- National Gene Vector Laboratory
- Southern California Islet Cell Consortium (SC-IC)
- Islet Cell Transplant Center
- Juvenile Diabetes Research Foundation

== Recognition ==
- In 2023, City of Hope was ranked as one of the top 10 "Best Hospitals" in cancer (No. 7) by U.S. News & World Report.
- In 2009, City of Hope was listed among eight preferred cancer hospitals in the May/June issue of AARP: The Magazine, which published the results of a survey of doctors from throughout the United States conducted by Consumers' Checkbook, a Washington, D.C.–based non-profit health care provider rating service. Sampled doctors were asked "where they were most likely to send patients with extremely difficult cases".
- As of 2016, 52 City of Hope physicians are currently listed as "Top Doctors" by Castle Connolly Medical Ltd., as nominated by their peers in the medical profession. Castle Connolly is an independent company that surveys thousands of medical professionals in the United States and publishes the results in an annual consumer guide, America's Top Doctors.
- In December 2015, CharityWatch rates City of Hope / Beckman Research Institute charity an "A−" grade.
- In 2016, Charity Navigator gave City of Hope a 4 stars – its highest rating – for the 11th consecutive year.
