= Samuel H. Golter =

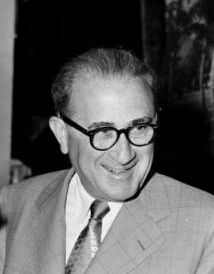
- Samuel H. Golter, 1953
- Born: January 24, 1890; Russia
- Died: March 31, 1971 (aged 81)
- Occupation: Physician

Signature
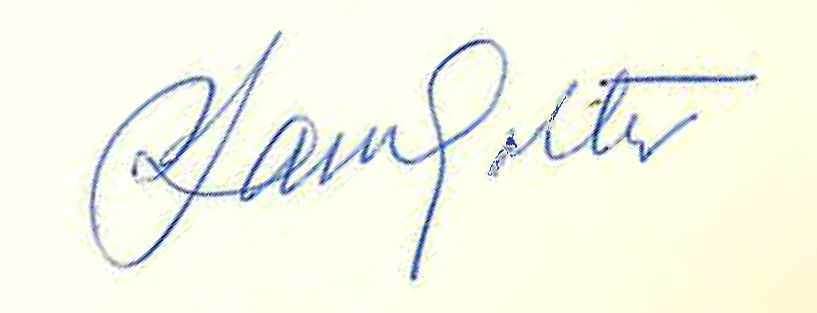

Samuel H. Golter (January 24, 1890 in Russia – March 31, 1971 in California, USA) was born in Russia but emigrated to the United States in 1906. In 1926, he became superintendent of the Los Angeles Sanatorium, a free treatment center run by the Jewish Consumptive Relief Association in Duarte, California. In 1932, Golter became Executive Director. He led a nationwide campaign to eliminate the institution's large debt, followed by a successful expansion. Under his leadership, the institution transitioned from a small tuberculosis treatment center to a major research, teaching, and treatment center for cancer and other diseases, with a $600,000 annual budget. Long nicknamed "The City of Hope", the expanded institution was officially renamed the City of Hope National Medical Center.

== Early life ==
Samuel Harry Golter was born in Russia on January 24, 1890 and emigrated to America in 1906, at the age of 16. In Chicago, he was able to stay with a family who he knew from Russia. He found work at a picture frame factory, and became sympathetic to the socialist movement because of the harassing methods used by some employers. During evenings and weekends, Golter studied to improve his education. He became the superintendent for the clothing manufacturer Hart, Schaffner and Marx in Chicago.

During World War I, Golter enlisted in the army. In 1920, Golter traveled to Eastern Europe as part of a relief mission, spending 2 years working with victims of the First World War.

== Jewish Consumptive Relief Association ==
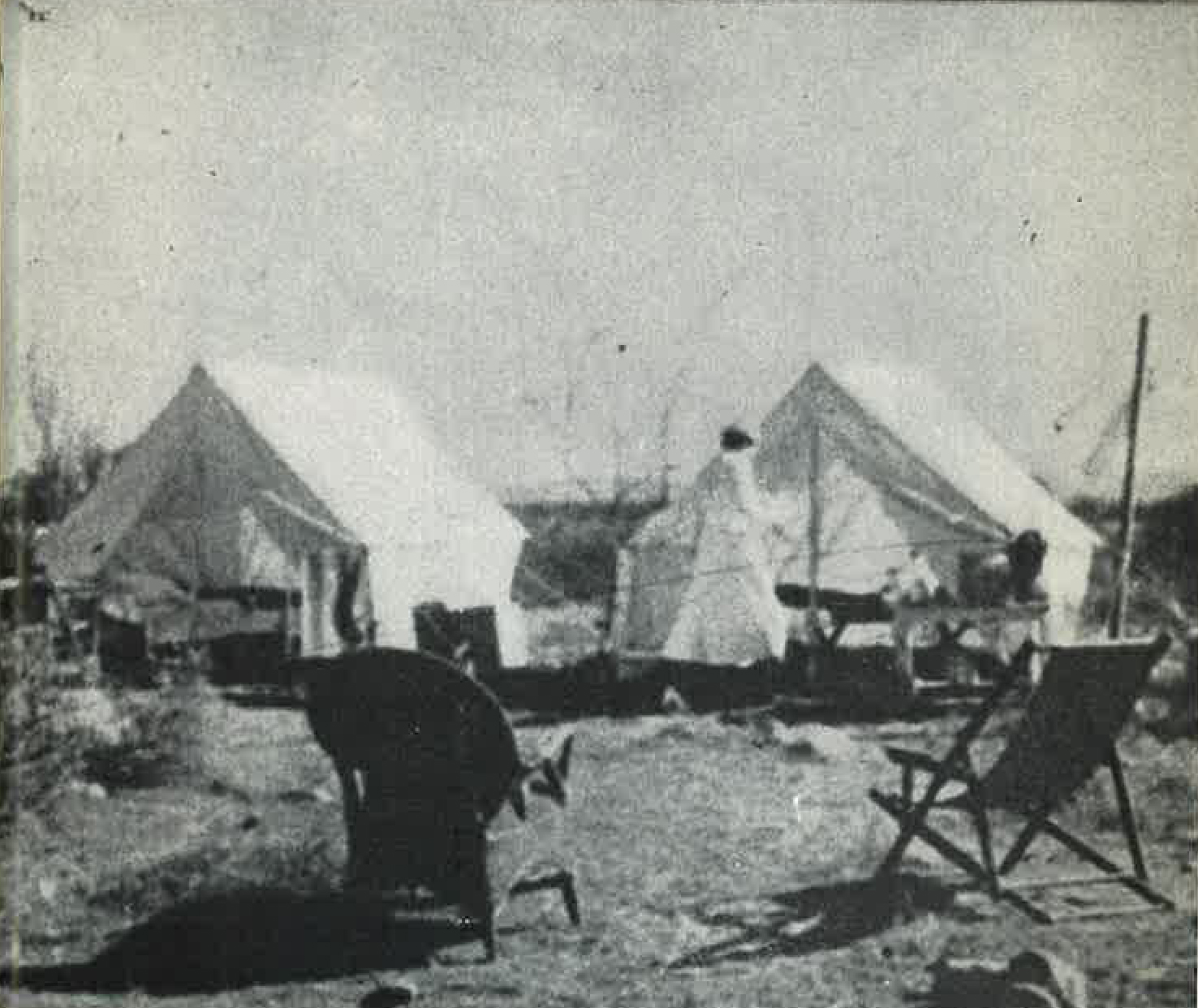
"In the beginning, two tents"

External videos
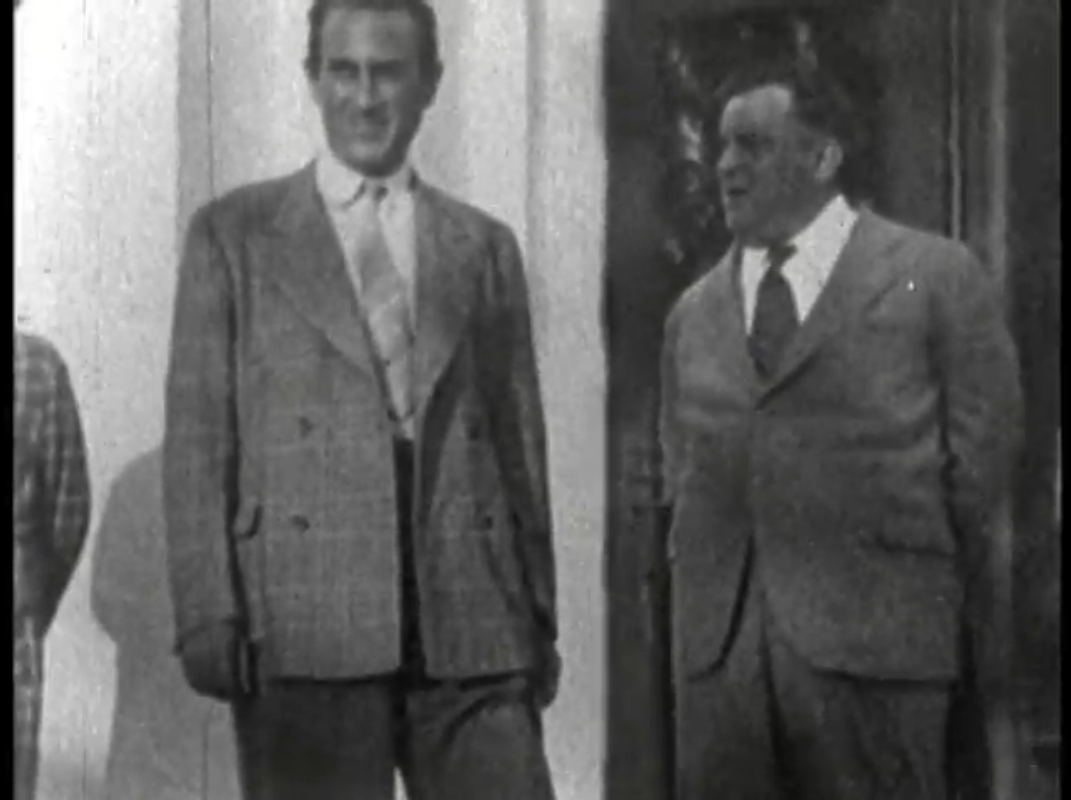
- Samuel Golter and Mayor La Guardia, in “Los Angeles Sanatorium and Expatients Home presents City of Hope, operated by the Jewish Consumptive and Expatients Relief Association”, Los Angeles Sanatorium

While visiting California Golter was invited by the Jewish Consumptive Relief Association, to visit the Los Angeles Sanatorium, a small tuberculosis sanatorium near Los Angeles which treated patients for free. The Jewish Consumptive Relief Association (JCRA), which ran the sanatorium, originated in 1912 and was incorporated in the State of California in May, 1913. In 1914, after the City of Los Angeles required all consumption facilities to be located outside the city limits, the JCRA bought ten acres of land in Duarte, California, and established the Los Angeles Sanatorium there. It initially consisted of two tents. These were later replaced by frame cottages.

In 1926, Golter became the sanatorium superintendent. In 1932, faced with the Great Depression and a large institutional debt, Golter took on the job of Executive Director with the goal of revitalizing the sanatorium. Golter developed a grassroots "People's Movement" to raise funds from across the United States. Travelling nationwide, he focused on three constituencies and encouraged them to form groups in support of the sanatorium: upper class women ("Auxiliaries"), young people ("Juniors"), and trade unions. He was able not only to save the institution, but to expand it during the 1930s and 1940s. It was nicknamed "The City of Hope".

== The City of Hope ==
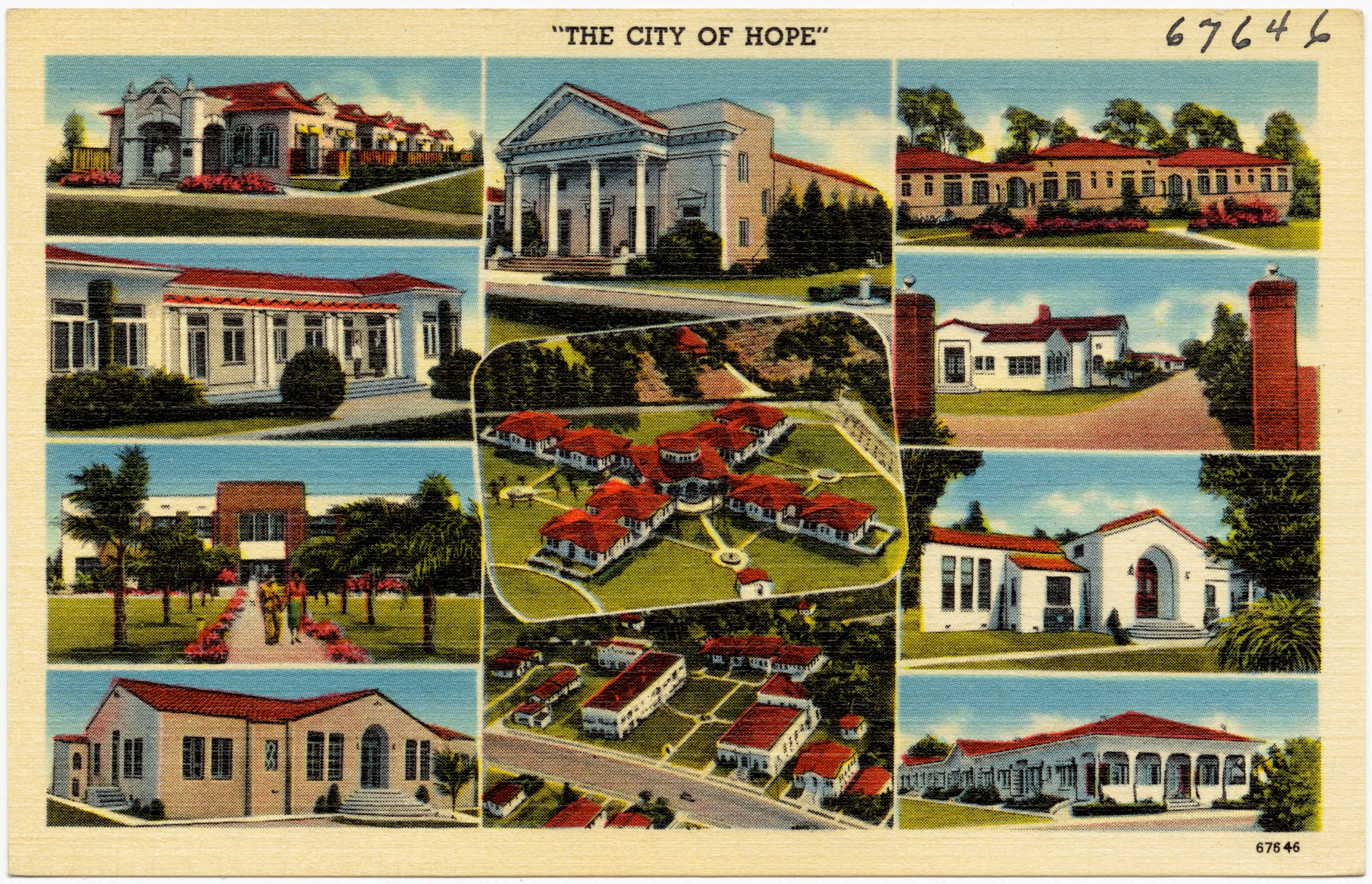
"The City of Hope", postcard, between 1930 and 1945

By the end of World War II, tuberculosis vaccines were beginning to significantly decrease the prevalence of tuberculosis, and the need for sanatoriums was lessening. In 1946, Golter proposed that the sanatorium become a comprehensive medical center. The board and delegates to the JCRA's biennial convention approved a campaign to build a new medical building and facilities for the treatment of diseases such as cancer in addition to tuberculosis. Golter partnered with the UCLA Medical School to create the new Medical Research Institute, the City of Hope National Medical Center. By 1952, the new center included facilities for research, and by 1953 it was accepting graduate students in the biological sciences. When Golter retired in 1953, the center had an annual budget of $600,000.

The humanitarian principles underlying the sanatorium were deeply important to Golter, who worked to ensure that it was a democratic, non-sectarian institution. It was important to respect the dignity of the patients who received free care, rather than viewing them as "charity" cases. He wrote a credo for the City of Hope base on "three pillars" of "service, humanitarianism, and reward", and developed "Thirteen Articles of Faith" based on the pillars, outlining a program for the institution. His motto, "There is no profit in curing the body, if in the process, we destroy the soul", appears on the Golter Gate in the International Garden of Meditation (the Rose Garden) at City of Hope, emphasizing this patient-centered philosophy. Regarding the sanatorium, he stated:

I felt more than ever that in enlarging the scope of our services we could satisfy both of the entities within man – the spiritual as well as the physical. Our functional program which was dedicated to the saving and prolonging of human life would serve man's physical self, and personal participation in furthering that humanitarian objective would fortify and strengthen his spiritual self.

Golter's book, The City of Hope, published in 1954, combined information about his personal life and the institution, explicitly examining his experience of persecution as a Jew, and the ways in which he felt that influenced his ideals and achievements.

Golter retired in 1953 and was succeeded by Ben Horowitz.

Golter died on Wednesday, March 31, 1971, and was buried at Hillside Memorial Cemetery. He was survived by his wife Rose and daughter Irma Sandra (Mrs. Benjamin F. Breslauer, Jr.).

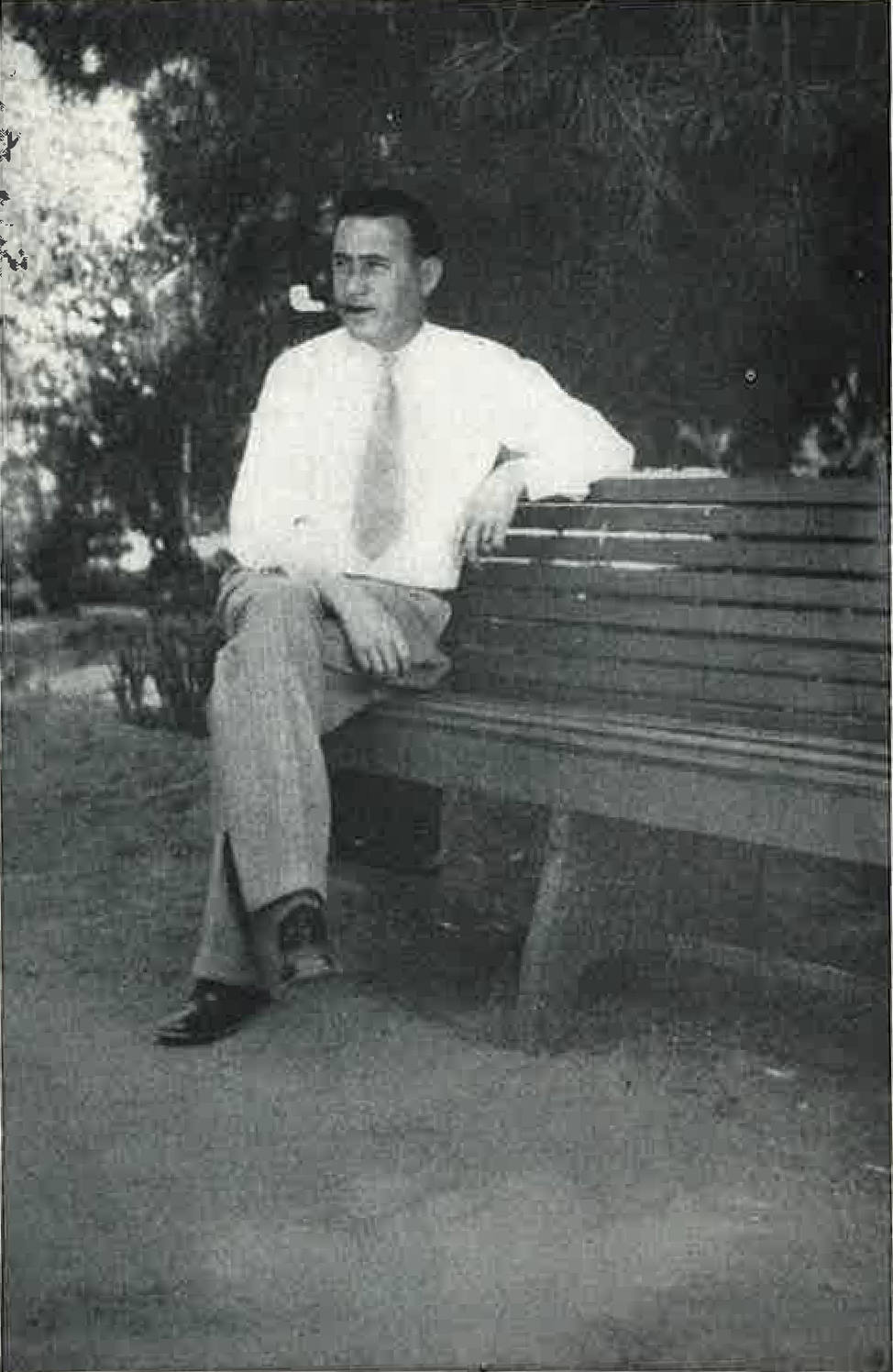
Samuel Golter ca. 1930

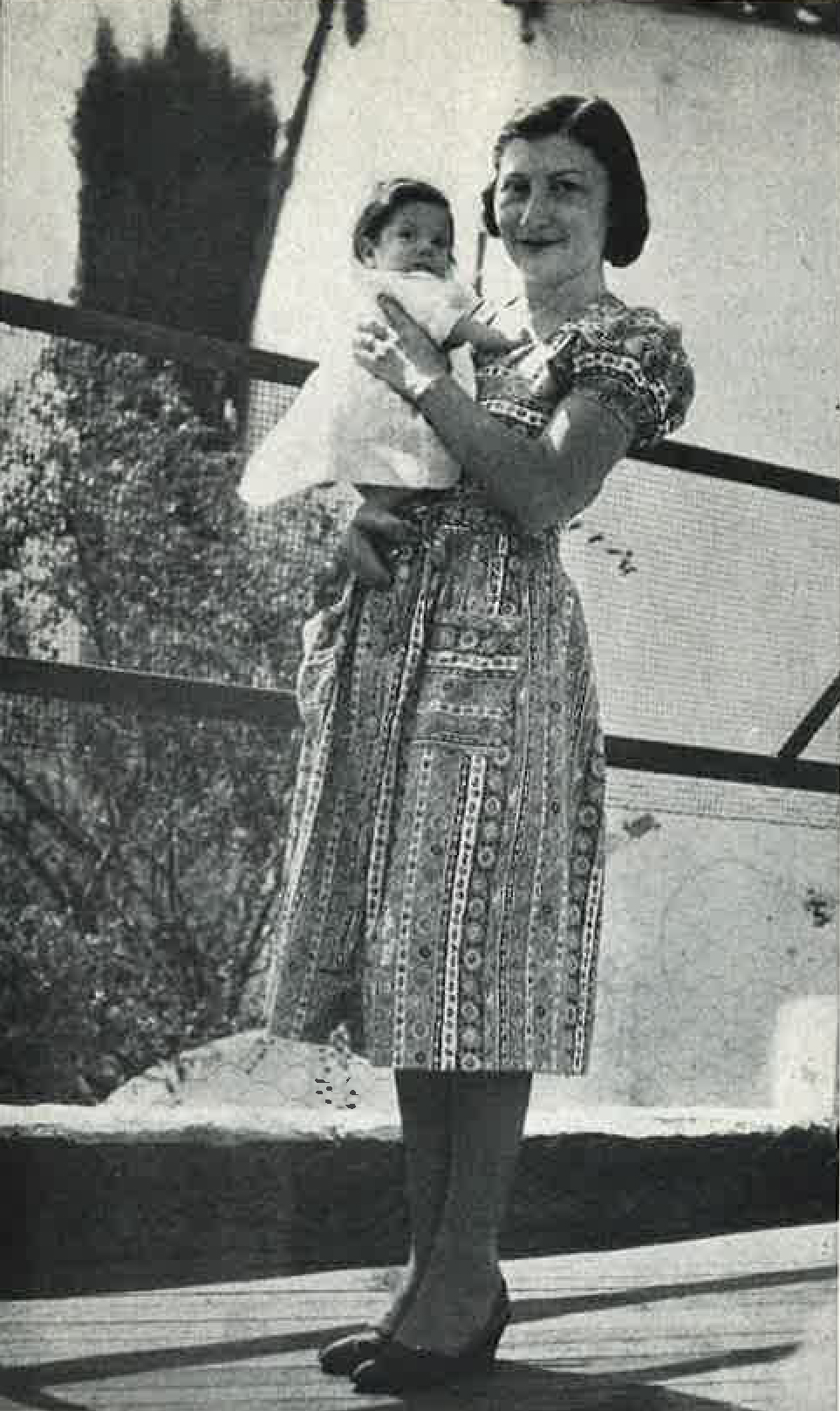
Rose and Irma Golter

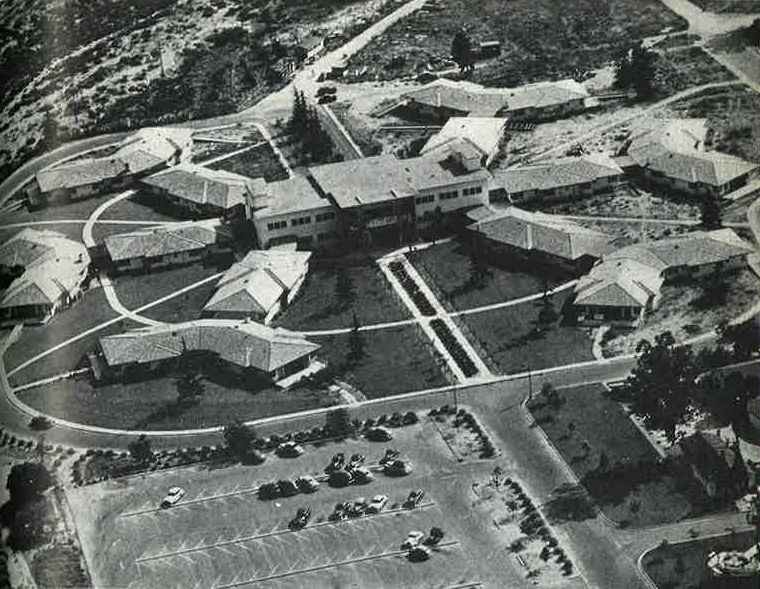
Aerial view of buildings at Los Angeles Sanitorium, The City of Hope

City of Hope continues to present a national award, the Samuel H. Golter Award, to fund-raising chapters who display the highest percentage increase in fund-raising over a two-year period.

== Books ==
- Golter, Samuel H. (1954). The City of Hope. New York: G. P. Putnam's Sons.
