= Imerman Angels =

American non-profit organization

- Formation: 2006; 20 years ago
- Founder: Jonny Imerman
- Type: non-profit organization
- Purpose: Providing one-on-one cancer support.
- Headquarters: Chicago, Illinois, U.S.
- Executive Director: Stephanie Lieber
- Website: imermanangels.org

Imerman Angels is a non-profit organization founded in the United States in 2006 that provides guidance and resources with an emphasis on one-on-one support for cancer fighters and caregivers. Jonny Imerman founded the organization after being diagnosed with testicular cancer in 2003 and realizing the need for one-on-one mental support. Imerman Angels connects cancer patients with cancer survivors to provide support through their journey from having cancer to being cancer-free. Patients are connected with nearby mentors through a database of over 6,000 cancer survivors.

The organization's headquarters is located in Chicago, Illinois, on Randolph and Wells in The Loop.

== Mission ==
Imerman Angels is a non-profit organization that aims to provide personalized connections with a focus on one-on-one support. The organization connects cancer fighters, survivors and caregivers through a database composed of volunteered survivors. The organization focuses on cancer patients with their goal being to create awareness and a community between cancer patients and survivors, build alliances between other organizations and raise funds. Their services are offered for free.

== History ==
=== Early history ===
Imerman Angels was founded in 2006 by Jonny Imerman after being first diagnosed with cancer. Originally from Michigan, Imerman felt the absence of a support system that provides one-on-one support to cancer patients. After battling cancer, Imerman decided to move to Chicago to create his vision of a support network that would connect cancer fighters with cancer survivors. By 2007, Imerman Angels connected 800 survivors, fighters and caregivers to a support network. The organization hosted over 13 events and attended 4 national conferences in efforts to raise funds. In 2008, Imerman Angels was one of the three winners of the Social Technology for Social Good contest. Imerman Angels were awarded a grant from Central Desktop Inc which provided the organization with subscription access to business productivity software. Imerman Angels had partnered with Chicago boutique chain, Akira, to host the sixth annual Garden of Eden Fashion show to spread awareness of their program.

=== 2014–present: New leadership and partnerships ===
Imerman Angels has partnered with several organizations and gotten donations from several donors to support their mentor program. In 2014, Imerman Angels hosted a party at the Birmingham Athletic Club to celebrate its launch in Michigan. The event's sole purpose was to gain awareness for Imerman Angels' significance to the cancer community in Detroit. In 2016, Phi Gamma Nu began a partnership with Imerman Angels and Tom Jones Challenger League to help fund research for lung cancer, among other things. During the filming of Blade Runner 2049, Ryan Gosling partnered with Omaze, an online fundraising platform, to benefit three organizations: Enough Project, Imerman Angels, and Hummingbird Foundation. Imerman Angels and MyLifeLine.org Cancer Foundation, an organization that provides online support for cancer patients, have joined together to announce new a partnership to bring social and emotional support services to people impacted of cancer.

Imerman Angels expanded to a total of 6,000 Mentor Angels throughout 65 different countries and made over 10,000 matches since its inception. One fifth of these matches are breast cancer survivors. Of those 2000 matches 1,165 individuals have become breast cancer Mentor Angels. Mentor Angels can be found in all 50 states.

In 2017, Imerman Angels becomes a beneficiary for @gives back. @gives back is a community foundation composed of agents, employees and people involved with @properties. @gives back partners with its corporate sponsors to cover high medical bills of families. This year @give back has partnered with Imerman Angels to fundraise money.

In 2018, Imerman Angels named their new Executive Director, Stephanie Lieber.

== Programs ==
=== Mentor Angels ===
Cancer survivors can apply to become a Mentor Angel through the Imerman's Angels official website. Mentor Angels are recruited worldwide and offer support, empathy, and understanding to cancer fighters. Mentor Angels are screened and trained by Imerman's Angels staff members.

Caregivers, people who have cared or are caring for someone else with cancer, can also apply through Imerman Angel's official website to become a Caregiver Mentor Angel. Caregiver Mentor Angels provided one-on-one support to families and caregivers of cancer fighters.

Imerman Angels provides one-on-on support to recovering cancer patients or individuals. Imerman Angels also provides financial assistance through fundraising and donations from their donors. Studies suggest that cancer support groups helped to create a positive environment for cancer patients and in some instances, increase longetivity. Online cancer support groups also assist cancer patients with questions regarding their disease. Online support groups are another alternative for cancer patients who are unable to get physical support.

== Fundraisers ==
=== Wings of Hope Gala ===
Imerman Angels holds its annual Wings of Hope Gala to commemorate years of providing assistance and resources to cancer fighters, survivors and caregivers. Price of attendance and contributions support the program through the next year.

=== En Noir Masquerade Gala ===
Imerman Angels held its first annual En Noir fundraiser in 2017. En Noir is a black tie, James Bond themed event. The event offers guests cocktails, live music, gambling tables, aerialist performances, and hors d'oeuvres throughout the night. A partial amount of proceeds raised directly benefit Imerman Angels.

== Jonny Imerman ==
Along with John May, Jonny Imerman co-founded Imerman Angels in 2006. At the age of 26, he was diagnosed with testicular cancer. Imerman realized something was wrong while out shooting pool with friends in Ann Arbor, Michigan, when a sharp pain doubled him over. Although Imerman had support from family and friends, he was unable to connect with someone who had experienced what he was going through. After beating cancer at the age of 29, Imerman decided to create an organization that provided mental support for cancer patients. Imerman moved from Michigan to Chicago with the goal of continuing to build the morale of other patients by trading stories and attempting to ensure no one is forced to fight cancer alone.

Imerman was awarded the LSA Humanitarian Service Award for his service in Imerman Angels.

== See also ==
- Cancer support group
