= Keiichi Itakura =

Keiichi Itakura (板倉 啓壹, Itakura Keiichi; born February 18, 1942, in Tokyo, Japan) is an organic chemist and a Professor in the Department of Molecular and Cellular Biology at the Beckman Research Institute at City of Hope National Medical Center.

== Biography ==
Itakura was born in Tokyo, Japan on February 18, 1942. He obtained a PhD in Organic Chemistry at Tokyo Pharmaceutical College in 1970. He then accepted a fellowship with Saran A. Narang at the Division of Biological Sciences, National Research Council of Canada, to work on DNA synthesis.

In 1975, Itakura joined the City of Hope National Medical Center. There he was part of a team of scientists including Arthur Riggs who developed recombinant DNA technology. By 1976, the first artificial gene had been synthesized, by Har Gobind Khorana at MIT, and the possibility of synthesizing insulin through bacterial fermentation by incorporating a gene for insulin into a bacterium such as E. coli had been suggested.

Itakura and others succeeded in synthesizing a plasmid containing chemically synthesized lac operator in 1976, using a technique they called "linker technology".

"We used the technology that Itakura was the master of to make small pieces of DNA, which greatly improved the ability to cut and splice exactly where you wanted. We devised how you can put them exactly where you want them... That was a major contribution." Arthur Riggs

In 1977, Itakura successfully synthesized the gene for somatostatin. Production of somatostatin, a hormone produced in the human brain, was not expected to be commercially significant. However, the work was considered a possible first step towards the creation of a synthetic insulin. Building on Khorana's work, Itakura developed a technique that reduced the time involved in successful synthesis from years to weeks. He then inserted the gene for somatostatin into E. coli. This was the first demonstration of a foreign gene inserted into E. coli.

By 1978 Herbert Boyer's biotechnology startup Genentech had contracted with Riggs and Itakura, and Boyer and Itakura had created a plasmid coded for human insulin. Genentech signed a joint-venture agreement with Eli Lilly and Company to develop and market the technology. Their product, Humulin, approved in 1982 by the FDA, was the first biotechnology product to be marketed. Genentech patented techniques that list Itakura and Riggs as the inventors, and are known as the Riggs-Itakura patents. As their principal organic chemist, Keiichi Itakura was essential to the success of Genentech's development of synthetic insulin. His work on recombinant DNA technology has had a significant impact in molecular biology and biochemistry.

Keiichi Itakura became a senior research scientist at City of Hope in 1980. In 1982, he formed the Department of Molecular Genetics (later the Department of Molecular and Cellular Biology). Itakura became director of City of Hope's genetics laboratory in 1989. As of 2016 he continues to work and teach at City of Hope.

== Awards and honours ==
- 1991, Member, New York Academy of Sciences
- 1979, David Rumbough Scientific Award, Juvenile Diabetes Research Foundation
