= Filter binding assay =

In biochemistry or chemistry, filter binding assay is a method study the binding of macromolecules. It enables the determination of the binding constant, a number that describes the ratio of unbound and bound molecules. This information reveals the affinity between the two molecules and allows prediction of the amount bound given any set of initial conditions. It is often used in pharmaceutical discovery.

In order to measure a binding constant, one must find a way to measure the amount of complex formed over a range of starting concentrations. This can be achieved by "labeling" one of the species with a fluorescent, or in this case, a radioactive tag. The DNA is "labeled" by the addition of radioactive phosphate derived from adenosine triphosphate.

== Description ==
A filter binding assay measures affinities between two molecules (often protein and DNA/RNA) using a filter. The filter is constructed of nitrocellulose paper, which is negatively charged. Since most proteins have a net positive charge, nitrocellulose paper is ideal for immobilizing proteins. DNA is negatively charged due to the phosphate backbone and will not "stick" to the nitrocellulose on its own, however, any DNA that has been bound by protein will stick. The exact amount of DNA "stuck" to the nitrocellulose is quantified by measuring the amount of radioactivity on the filter using a scintillation counter.

Typically, protein and DNA are mixed in a series of separate binding reactions in which the amount of DNA is kept constant across each reaction, but the amount of protein is varied. These samples are allowed to equilibrate. After equilibration, an equal volume from each reaction is deposited onto small, round, nitrocellulose filters which are arranged on a vacuum plate (a flat surface that has a vacuum applied from below to suck fluid downward). All of the protein will stick, but only the protein that has bound DNA will register in the scintillation counter.

Using the amount of DNA bound for each concentration of protein used, a binding curve can be plotted to determine the binding constant.

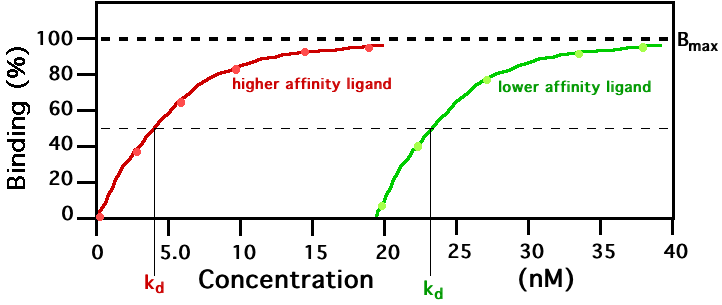

This assay is no longer used widely, but it is rapid and simple, and can yield useful and detailed information on specific protein-DNA interactions.

Measure the equilibrium constant:

- Incubate labeled DNA with protein.
- Allow enough time to allow the system to reach equilibrium.
- Filter the mixture through a filter disk made of nitrocellulose. Proteins bind to nitrocellulose, but DNA does not.
- Any DNA that is retained on the filter is there because it is interacting with the protein.
- Dry the filters and count.

Measure the off-rate:

- Take the filter with DNA-protein complex bound on it
- Wash the filter with buffer
- Quantify the amount of DNA remained on filter after it has been washed for a certain amount of time.

Another way of measuring off-rate:

- Radioactive labeled DNA and protein were pre-incubated together in high concentrations
- At time 0, the mixture was diluted
- Aliquotes were assayed at various times using nitrocellulose filters
