= Daniel J. Wallace =

American rheumatologist

Daniel Jeffrey Wallace
- Born: October 27, 1949 (age 77); Los Angeles, California
- Education: University of Southern California; University of California, Los Angeles
- Occupations: Medical doctor, rheumatologist
- Spouse: Janice Brock Wallace
- Children: 3

Daniel Jeffrey Wallace (born October 27, 1949) is an American rheumatologist, clinical professor, and author. Wallace has published 500 peer reviewed publications, 9 textbooks, and 28 book chapters on topics such as lupus, Sjögren syndrome, osteoarthritis, and fibromyalgia. He has had the largest cohort of lupus patients in the United States (2000). A full professor of medicine (Cedars-Sinai Medical Center, David Geffen School of Medicine at UCLA), he is associate director of the Rheumatology fellowship program at Cedars-Sinai. His contributions to research include being an author of the first paper to demonstrate vitamin D dysfunction and the importance of interleukin 6 in lupus, conducting the first large studies of apheresis in rheumatoid arthritis and lupus, and insights into the mechanisms of action of antimalarials. Wallace's research accomplishments also include conducting many clinical rheumatic disease trials, examining the role of microvascular angina and accelerated atherogenesis in lupus, and work on anti-telomere antibodies which have garnered him 6 papers in The New England Journal of Medicine. Wallace's monograph, The Lupus Book, has sold over 100,000 copies since 1995, and he has edited the last 8 editions of Dubois Lupus Erythematosus, the major lupus textbook.

== Early and education ==
Daniel Wallace was born to parents Leon and Fern Wallace in Los Angeles on October 27, 1949. Leon Wallace was a cardiologist who also graduated from University of Southern California. Leon was an intern at Bellevue Hospital. Fern Wallace was a philanthropist and supported many charities. Daniel Wallace was raised in Carthay Circle in Los Angeles and attended Fairfax High School.

Wallace earned a BA at the University of Southern California. He graduated with an MD from the University of Southern California. He completed his medical internship at Brown University and a medical residency at Cedars-Sinai Medical Center. He was also a fellow at University of California, Los Angeles.

== Career ==
Wallace has been a practicing medicine since 1979. During the 1980s, Wallace was chief rheumatology consultant for City of Hope Medical Center. In the early 1990s, Wallace was clinical chief of rheumatology at Cedars-Sinai. He currently runs his lupus cohort at Wallace and Lee Center in Beverly Hills, California. Wallace is the medical director of the Wallace Rheumatic Studies Center, which is responsible for several clinical trials and directs the Lupus and Sjogren's clinic at Cedar's Sinai Medical Center. Wallace cares for lupus patients from around the world through his private practice. He is a professor of medicine at both UCLA and Cedars-Sinai Medical Center. Wallace is Fellow of the American College of Physicians, the American College of Rheumatology, and the Royal College of Physicians in London. Wallace also teaches and provides medical care outside of his office hours.

Wallace has written 9 textbooks on autoimmune diseases such as lupus, fibromyalgia, osteoarthritis, and Sjögren syndrome. Wallace has authored 28 book chapters and supplements on these same topics. Wallace has also written 500 peer-reviewed manuscripts. He has been the recipient of NIH and Department of Defense grants.

== Charitable work ==
Wallace and Adam Selkowitz founded Lupus LA, an organization that raises money for Lupus research and patient care. Wallace served on the Medical Executive Committee for the American Society for Apheresis from 1987-1989. He was Co-Chairman (1999-2000) and Vice President (1999-2000) the Lupus Foundation of America and served on the National Medical Advisory Board. He now serves on the Board of Directors of the Lupus Research Alliance, Lupus Therapeutics, and the Sjogren's Foundation. Wallace served as Chairman of the Research and Education Foundation of the American College of Rheumatology. Wallace was on the Board of Directors of the Lupus Research Institute and is on the Board of Directors of the Lupus Research Alliance and Lupus Therapeutics. Wallace was also on the Board of Directors for the United Scleroderma Foundation from 2001-2004. In addition to chairing the Annual Trial Consortium of the Sjogren's Foundation, he also edits The Sjogren's Book.

== Personal life ==
Daniel Wallace is married to Janice Wallace.

== Awards ==
- Humanitarian Award, Lupus Foundation of America, 1989 and 1991
- "Best Doctors in the United States", Town and Country Magazine, October, 1989
- The Best Doctors in America, Woodward/White, Aiken, SC, 1994
- "Best Doctors in Los Angeles", Los Angeles Magazine, 1996
- Jane Wyman Humanitarian Award, Arthritis Foundation, 1996 and 2018
- “Spirit of Hope” Award, Southern California Scleroderma Foundation, 2001
- Achievement Award, SLE Foundation, 2002
- "America's Top Doctors", U.S. News & World Report, 2004–2019
- Sjogren Syndrome Foundation Healthcare Professional Leadership Award, 2012
- Los Angeles County Medical Association, Innovation Award for Community Service, 2017

== Bibliography ==
- Wallace, DJ and Dubois EL, eds., Dubois' Lupus Erythematosus, 3rd Edition, Lea and Febiger, Philadelphia, PA, 1987, 775 pp
- Wallace, DJ and Hahn, BH, eds, Dubois' Lupus Erythematosus, 4th Edition, Lea and Febiger, Philadelphia, PA, 1993, 953 pp
- Wallace DJ, The Lupus Book, Oxford University Press, NY/London, 1995, 258 pp
- Wallace DJ, Hahn BH, Eds., Dubois' Lupus Erythematosus, 5th Edition, Williams and Wilkins, Baltimore, MD, 1997, 1289 pp
- Wallace DJ, The Lupus Book, New and Revised, Oxford University Press, NY/ London, 2000, 271 pp
- Lane NE, Wallace DJ, All About Osteoarthritis, Oxford University Press, NY/London, 2001, 258 pp.
- Wallace DJ, Hahn BH, Eds, Dubois' Lupus Erythematosus, 6th Edition, Lippincott Williams & Wilkins, Philadelphia, PA, 2002, 1348 pp
- Wallace DJ, Wallace JB, All About Fibromyalgia, Oxford University Press, NY/London, 2002, 258 pp
- Wallace DJ, Editor, The New Sjogren's Syndrome Handbook, Oxford University Press, NY/London, Revised and Expanded 3rd Edition, 2005, 265 pp.
- Wallace DJ, Clauw DJ, Fibromyalgia and other central pain syndromes, Lippincott Williams & Wilkins, Philadelphia, PA, 421 pages, 2005. 10.
- Wallace DJ, Hahn BH Eds, Dubois' Lupus Erythematosus, 7th Edition, Lippincott Williams & Wilkins, 2007, Philadelphia, PA, 1441 pp.
- Wallace DJ, Hahn BH Eds, Dubois' Lupus Erythematosus, 8th Edition, Elsevier, 2013, Philadelphia, PA, 694 pp.
- Wallace DJ, Hahn BH Eds, Dubois' Lupus Erythematosus, 9th Edition, Elsevier, 2018, Philadelphia, PA, 800 pp.
- Wallace DJ, Editor, The Sjogren’s Book, 5th Edition, Oxford University Press, New York, 2022.
- Wallace DJ, BH Hahn, editors, Dubois’ Lupus Erythematosus and Related Syndromes. 10th Edition, Elsevier, Edinburgh, 2023, in press
