= Irell & Manella Graduate School of Biological Sciences =

Graduate school in Duarte, California, US

Coordinates: 34.128767°N 117.973398°W

- Type: Graduate school
- Established: 1994
- Dean: David Ann, Ph.D.
- Faculty: 59
- Students: 80
- Location: Duarte, California, United States
- Campus: Medical school
- Website: https://www.cityofhope.org/education/irell-and-manella-graduate-school-of-biological-sciences

The Irell & Manella Graduate School of Biological Sciences (formerly the City of Hope Graduate School of Biological Sciences) is a graduate school for biology in the City of Hope National Medical Center in Duarte, California.

== Program ==
The Irell & Manella Graduate School of Biological Sciences is a doctoral and masters program that trains students to become research scientists with expertise in chemical, molecular, and cellular biology. Graduates of this program are awarded the degree of Doctor of Philosophy (Ph.D.) in Biological Sciences or the degree of Master of Science (M.S.) in Translational Medicine, and as such are equipped to address fundamental questions in the life sciences and biomedicine. Most graduates pursue careers in academia, industry, or government.

The school is housed at the Beckman Research Institute of the City of Hope National Medical Center. It is accredited by the Accrediting Commission for Senior Colleges and Universities of the Western Association of Schools and Colleges.

== See also ==
- Beckman Research Institute
- City of Hope National Medical Center
