= Herbert Boyer =

American researcher and businessman

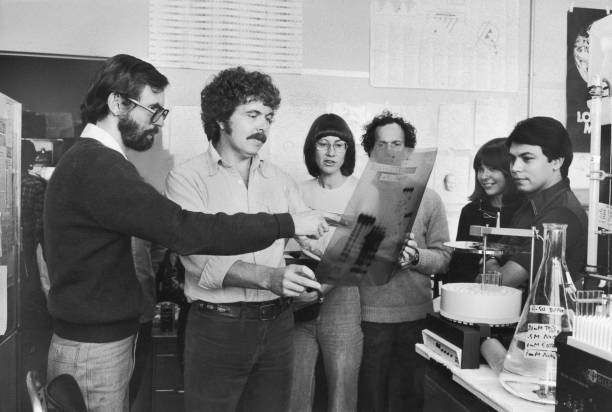
- Herbert Boyer (second from left) in 1977
- Born: July 10, 1936 (age 90); Derry, Pennsylvania, U.S.
- Education: Saint Vincent College (B.S., 1958); University of Pittsburgh (Ph.D. 1963)
- Awards: National Medal of Science (1990)
- Scientific career
- Fields: Biology

Herbert Wayne "Herb" Boyer (born July 10, 1936) is an American biotechnologist, researcher and entrepreneur in biotechnology. Along with Stanley N. Cohen and Paul Berg, he discovered recombinant DNA, a method to coax bacteria into producing foreign proteins, which aided in jump-starting the field of genetic engineering. By 1969, he had performed studies on a couple of restriction enzymes of E. coli with especially useful properties.

He is recipient of the 1990 National Medal of Science, co-recipient of the 1996 Lemelson–MIT Prize, and a co-founder of Genentech. He was professor at the University of California, San Francisco (UCSF) and later served as vice president of Genentech from 1976 until his retirement in 1991.

== Early life and education ==
Herbert Boyer was born in 1936 in Derry, Pennsylvania. He received his bachelor's degree in biology and chemistry from Saint Vincent College in Latrobe, Pennsylvania, in 1958. He married his wife Grace the following year. He received his PhD at the University of Pittsburgh in 1963 and participated as an activist in the civil rights movement.

== Career ==
Boyer spent three years in postdoctoral work at Yale University in the laboratories of Professors Edward Adelberg and Bruce Carlton, and then became an assistant professor at the University of California, San Francisco and a professor of biochemistry from 1976 to 1991, where he discovered that genes from bacteria could be combined with genes from eukaryotes. In 1977, Boyer's laboratory and collaborators Keiichi Itakura and Arthur Riggs at City of Hope National Medical Center described the first-ever synthesis and expression of a peptide-coding gene. In August 1978, he produced synthetic insulin using his new transgenic genetically modified bacteria, followed in 1979 by a growth hormone.

In 1976, Boyer founded Genentech with venture capitalist Robert A. Swanson. Genentech's approach to the first synthesis of insulin won out over Walter Gilbert's approach at Biogen which used whole genes from natural sources. Boyer built his gene from its individual nucleotides.

In 1990, Boyer and his wife Grace gave the single largest donation ($10,000,000) bestowed on the Yale School of Medicine by an individual. The Boyer Center for Molecular Medicine was named after the Boyer family in 1991.

At the Class of 2007 Commencement, St. Vincent College announced that they had renamed the School of Natural Science, Mathematics, and Computing the Herbert W. Boyer School.

Among his professional activities, Boyer is on the board of directors of Scripps Research.

== Awards ==
- 1980 the Albert Lasker Award for Basic Medical Research
- 1981 the Golden Plate Award of the American Academy of Achievement
- 1982 the Industrial Research Institute (IRI) Achievement Award
- 1989 the National Medal of Technology
- 1990 the National Medal of Science from President George H. W. Bush
- 1993 Helmut Horten Research Award
- 2000 Biotechnology Heritage Award with Robert A. Swanson, from the Biotechnology Industry Organization (BIO) and the Chemical Heritage Foundation
- 2004 Albany Medical Center Prize (shared with Stanley N. Cohen)
- 2004 Shaw Prize in Life Science and Medicine
- 2005 Winthrop-Sears Medal
- 2007 Perkin Medal
- 2009 CSHL Double Helix Medal Honoree
