= Double Helix Medal =

Human health award

- Awarded for: Individuals who have positively impacted human health by raising awareness and funds for biomedical research
- Country: United States
- Presented by: Cold Spring Harbor Laboratory
- First award: 2006
- Website: www.cshl.edu/giving/double-helix-medals-dinner

The Double Helix Medal has been awarded annually since 2006 by Cold Spring Harbor Laboratory (CSHL) to individuals who have positively impacted human health by raising awareness and funds for biomedical research. At the inaugural dinner, Muhammad Ali received the first Double Helix Medal for his fight against Parkinson's disease. Other notable recipients include founders of Autism Speaks Suzanne and Bob Wright; former Paramount Pictures head Sherry Lansing who produced the Stand Up to Cancer telethon; Evelyn Lauder who founded the Breast Cancer Research Foundation; Hank Greenberg of the Starr Foundation, which is one of the largest supporters of scientific research; Marilyn and Jim Simons, the world's largest individual supporters of autism research; David H. Koch who has donated over $300 million to biomedical research; and prominent scientists and Nobel laureates.

The Double Helix Medal is named for the iconic structure of the DNA molecule, discovered by James D. Watson, Francis Crick, Maurice Wilkins, and Rosalind Franklin. The study of DNA is central to biological research, and is at the heart of work at CSHL.

The annual New York City gala at which the medals are awarded was sparked by philanthropist Cathy Cyphers Soref, an Honorary Director of the Cold Spring Harbor Laboratory Association.

== Medal recipients ==
2022:

- Albert Bourla, Ph.D.
- Jennifer Doudna, Ph.D.

2021:

- Reggie Jackson
- Leonard S. Schleifer, M.D., Ph.D.
- George D. Yancopoulos, M.D., Ph.D.

2020:

2019:

- Boomer Esiason
- Nancy Wexler, Ph.D.

2018:/

- Priscilla Chan and Mark Zuckerberg
- Larry Norton, M.D.

2017:

- Tom Brokaw
- Helen & Charles Dolan

2016:

- Alan Alda
- P. Roy Vagelos

2015:

- David Botstein
- Katie Couric
- Anne Wojcicki

2014:

- Andrew Solomon
- Matthew Meselson
- Marlo Thomas

November 4, 2013:

- Peter Neufeld
- Robin Roberts
- Barry C. Scheck

November 28, 2012:

- Michael J. Fox
- Arthur D. Levinson
- Mary D. Lindsay

November 15, 2011:

- Kareem Abdul-Jabbar
- Temple Grandin
- Harold E. Varmus

November 9, 2010:

- Mary-Claire King
- Evelyn Lauder
- John F. Nash, Jr.

November 10, 2009:

- Herbert W. Boyer
- Stanley N. Cohen
- Kathryn W. Davis
- Maurice Greenberg

November 6, 2008:

- Sherry Lansing
- Marilyn and James Simons
- James D. Watson
- J. Craig Venter

November 8, 2007:

- David Koch
- Michael Wigler
- Richard Axel

November 9, 2006:

- Muhammad Ali
- Suzanne Wright
- Bob Wright
- Phillip Sharp
