= Biotechnology Heritage Award =

Award in biotechnology

- Awarded for: Contributions to the development of biotechnology.
- Date: 1999
- Presented by: Biotechnology Industry Organization, Science History Institute

The Biotechnology Heritage Award recognizes individuals who have made significant contributions to the development of biotechnology through discovery, innovation, and public understanding. It is presented annually at the Biotechnology Innovation Organization (BIO) Annual International Convention by the Biotechnology Innovation Organization (BIO, formerly the Biotechnology Industry Organization) and the Science History Institute (formerly the Chemical Heritage Foundation). The purpose of the award is "to encourage emulation, inspire achievement, and promote public understanding of modern science, industry, and economics".

== Recipients ==
The award is given yearly and was first presented in 1999.

- Jay Flatley, 2026
- Leonard S. Schleifer and George D. Yancopoulos, 2025
- Susan Desmond-Hellmann, 2024
- Stéphane Bancel and John Maraganore, 2023
- Ivor Royston, 2022
- Frederick Frank, 2021
- Janet Woodcock, 2019
- William Rastetter, 2018
- John C. Martin, 2017
- Stanley Norman Cohen, 2016
- Moshe Alafi and William K. Bowes, 2015
- Robert S. Langer, 2014
- George Rosenkranz, 2013
- Nancy Chang, 2012
- Joshua S. Boger, 2011
- Arthur D. Levinson, 2010
- Robert T. Fraley, 2009
- Henri A. Termeer, 2008
- Ronald E. Cape, 2007
- Alejandro Zaffaroni, 2006
- Paul Berg, 2005
- Leroy Hood, 2004
- William J. Rutter, 2003
- Walter Gilbert, 2002
- Francis S. Collins and J. Craig Venter, 2001
- Herbert Boyer and Robert A. Swanson, 2000
- George B. Rathmann, 1999

=== Photo Gallery ===
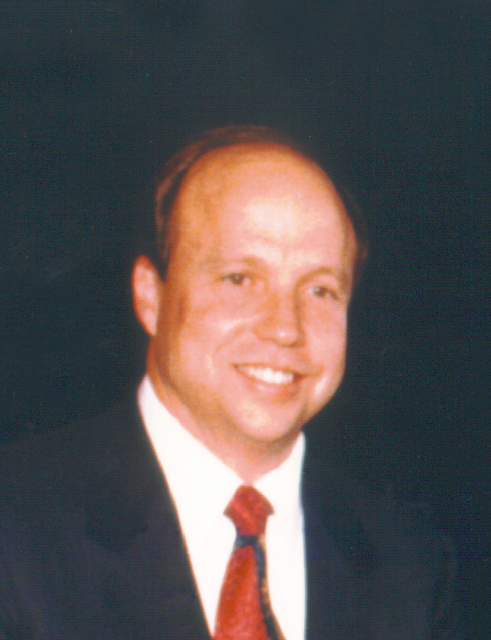
Robert A. Swanson (2000;
photo from 1999)

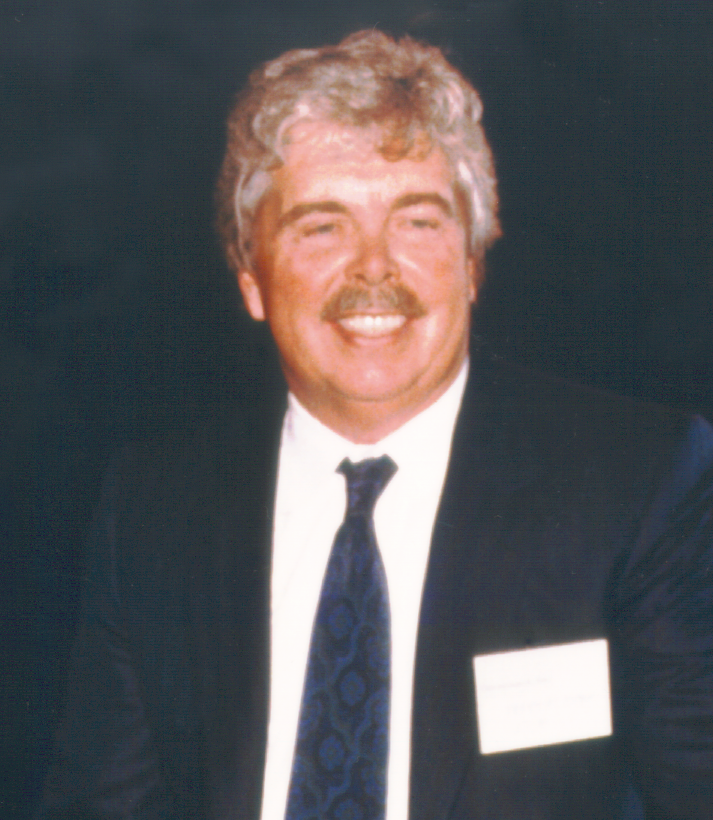
Herbert Boyer (2000;
photo from 1999)

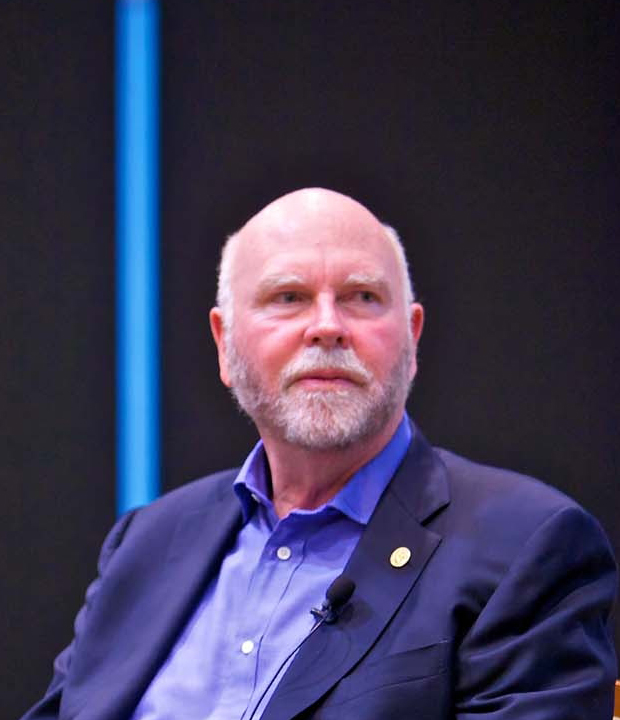
J. Craig Venter (2001;
photo from 2011)

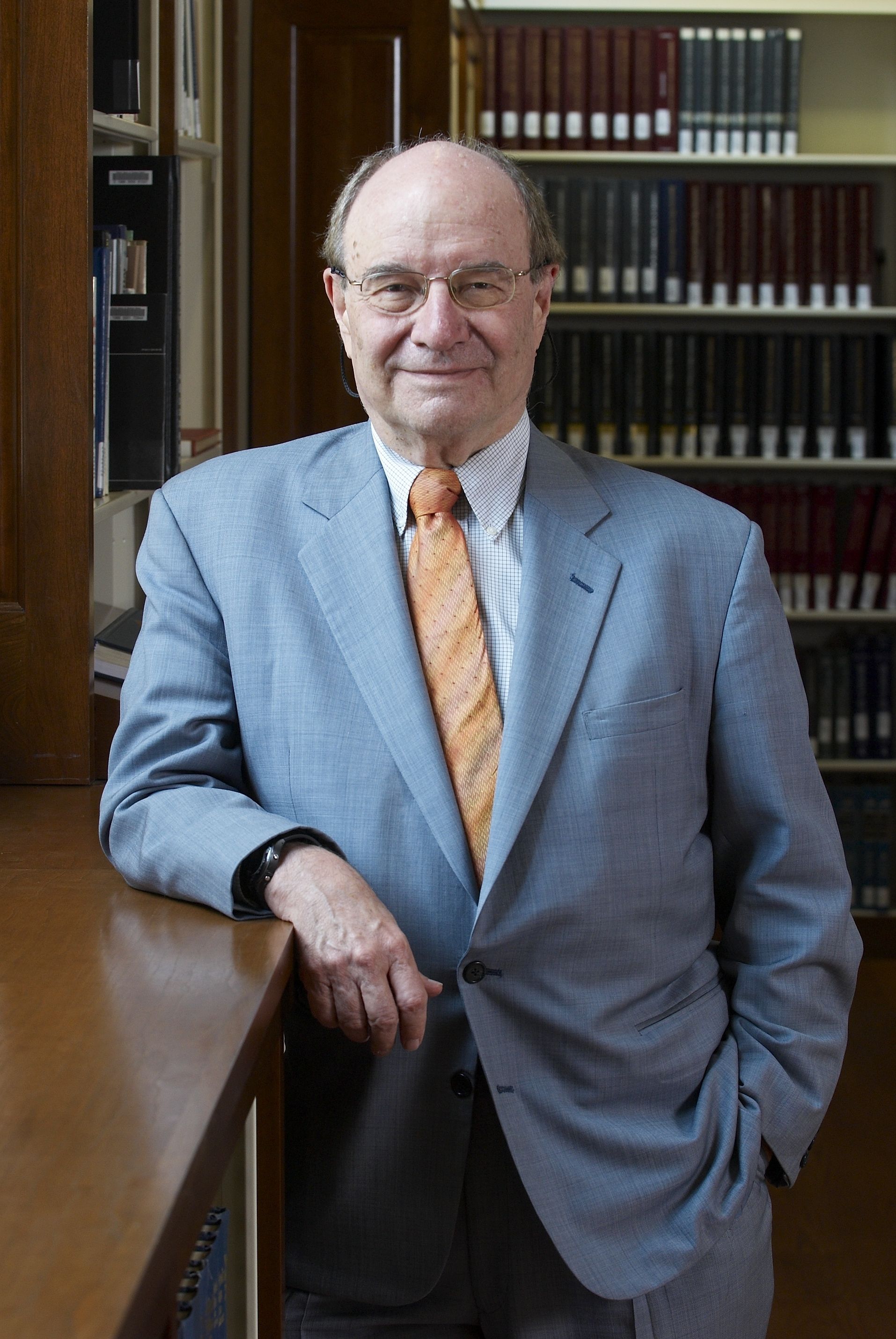
Walter Gilbert (2002;
photo from 2008)

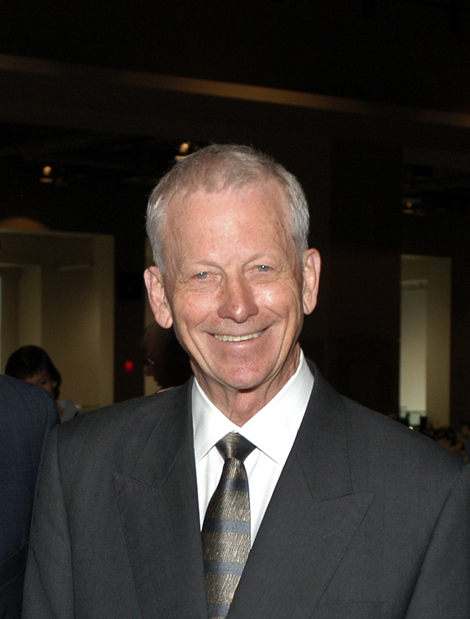
William Rutter (2003)

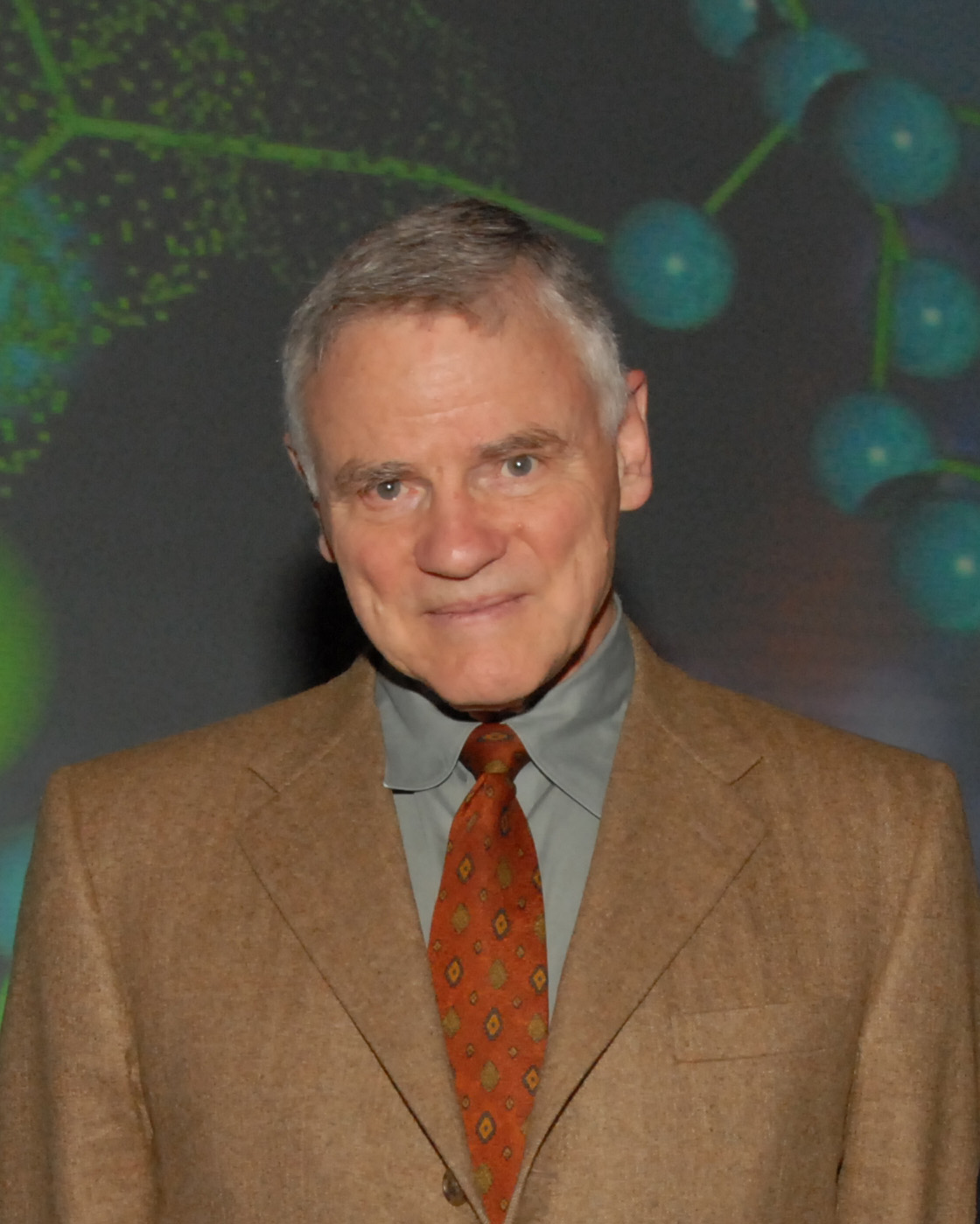
Leroy Hood (2004;
photo from 2008)

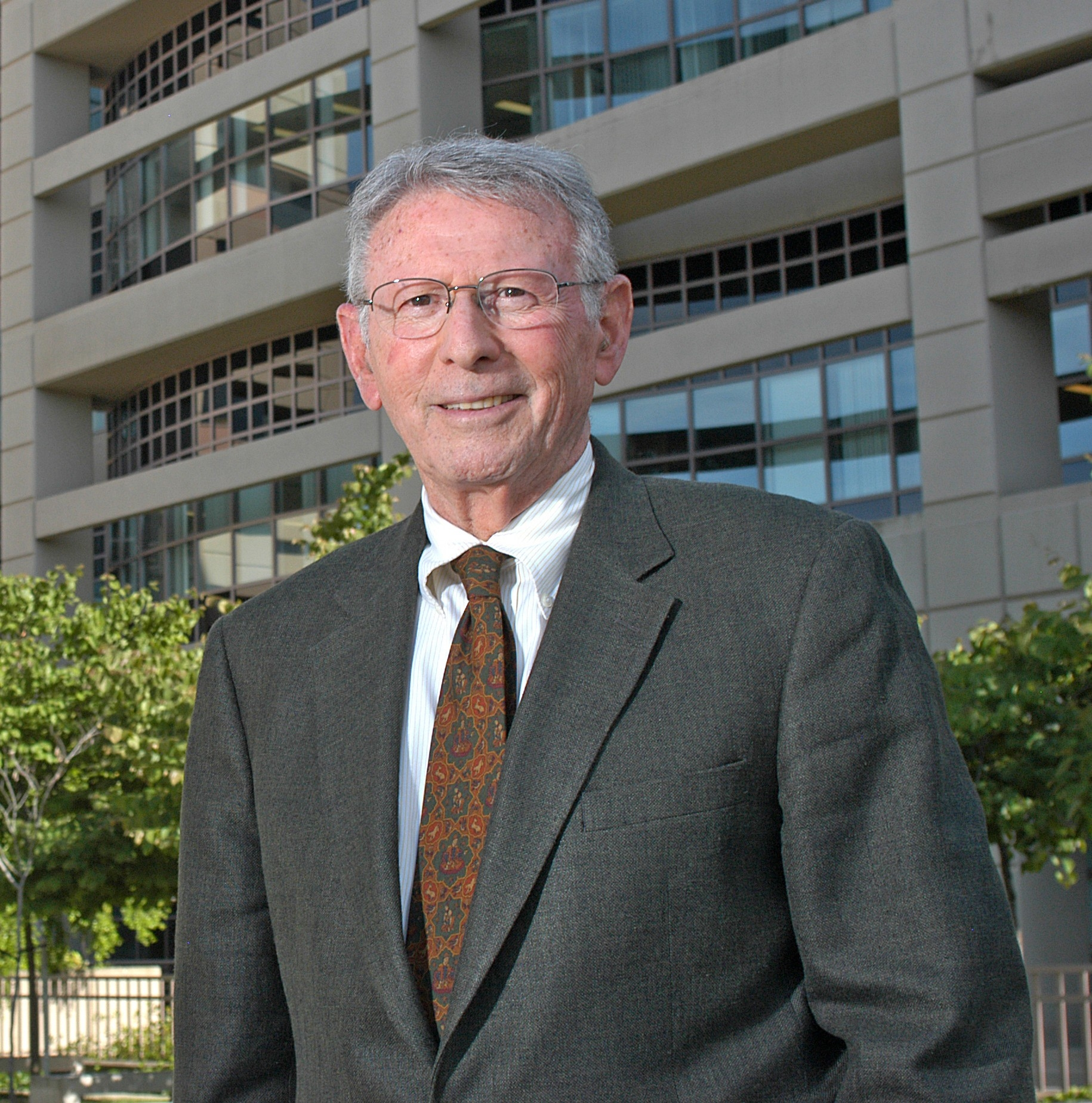
Paul Berg (2005;
photo from 2008)

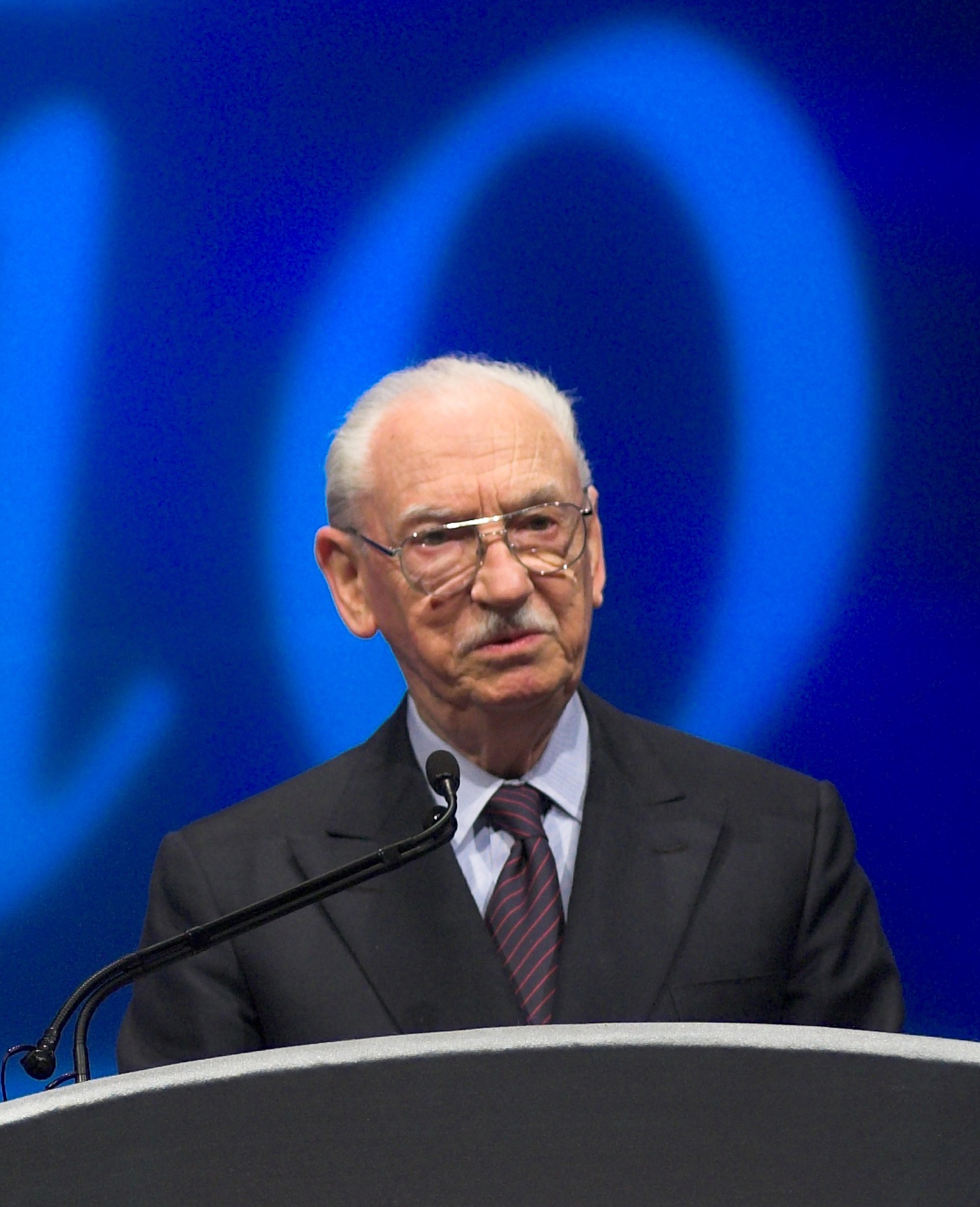
Alejandro Zaffaroni (2006)

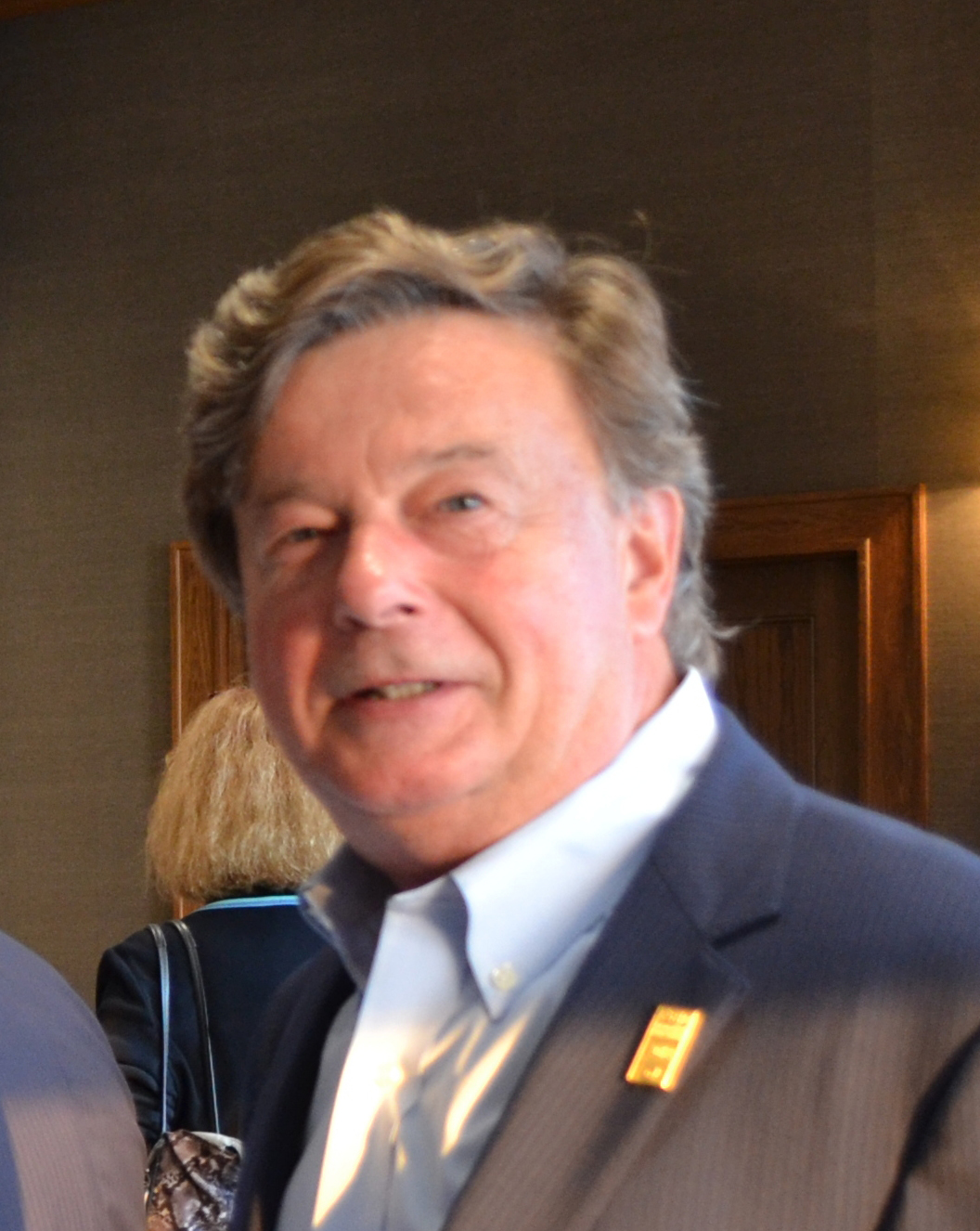
Henri Termeer (2008;
photo from 2012)

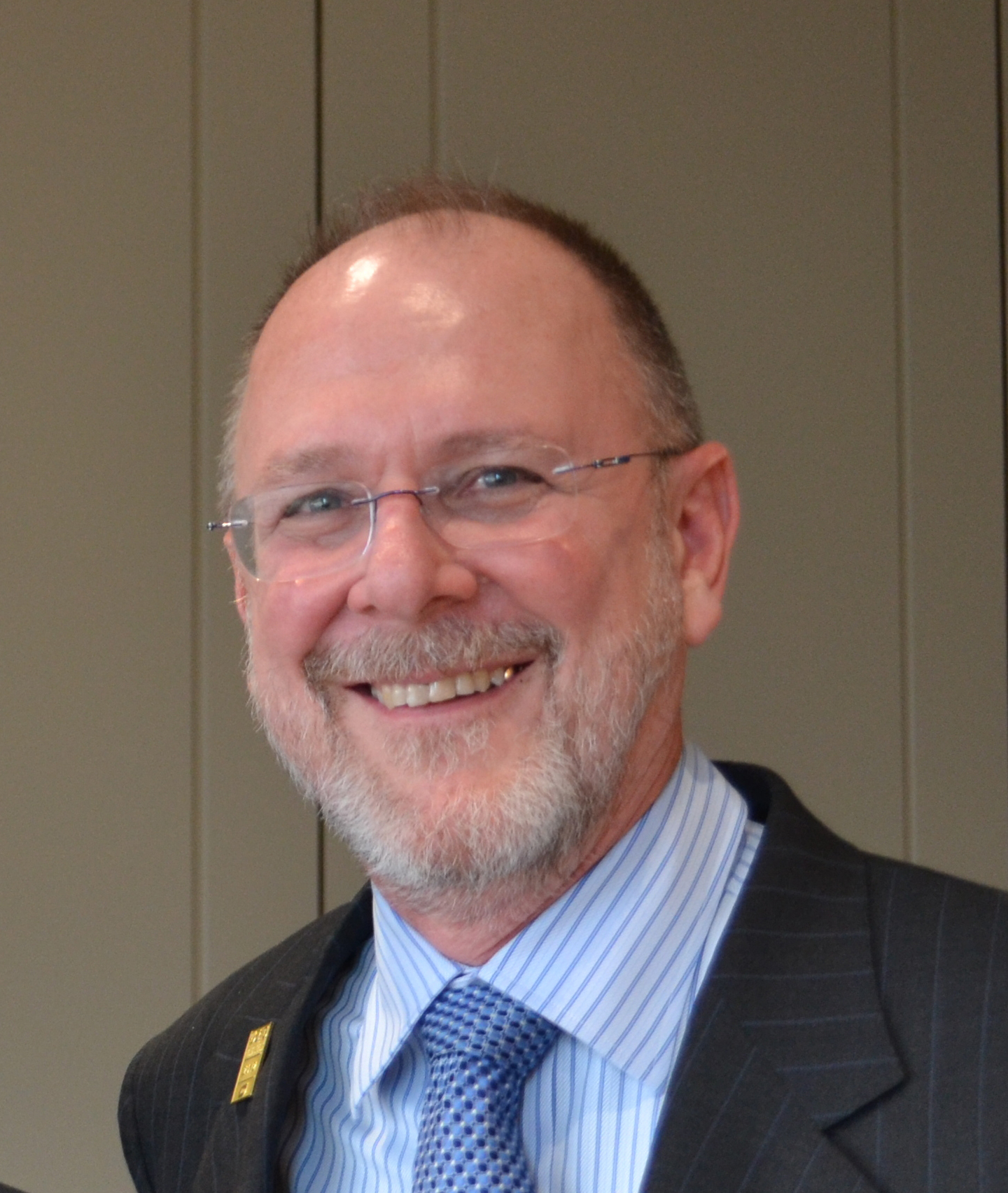
Joshua Boger (2011;
photo from 2012)

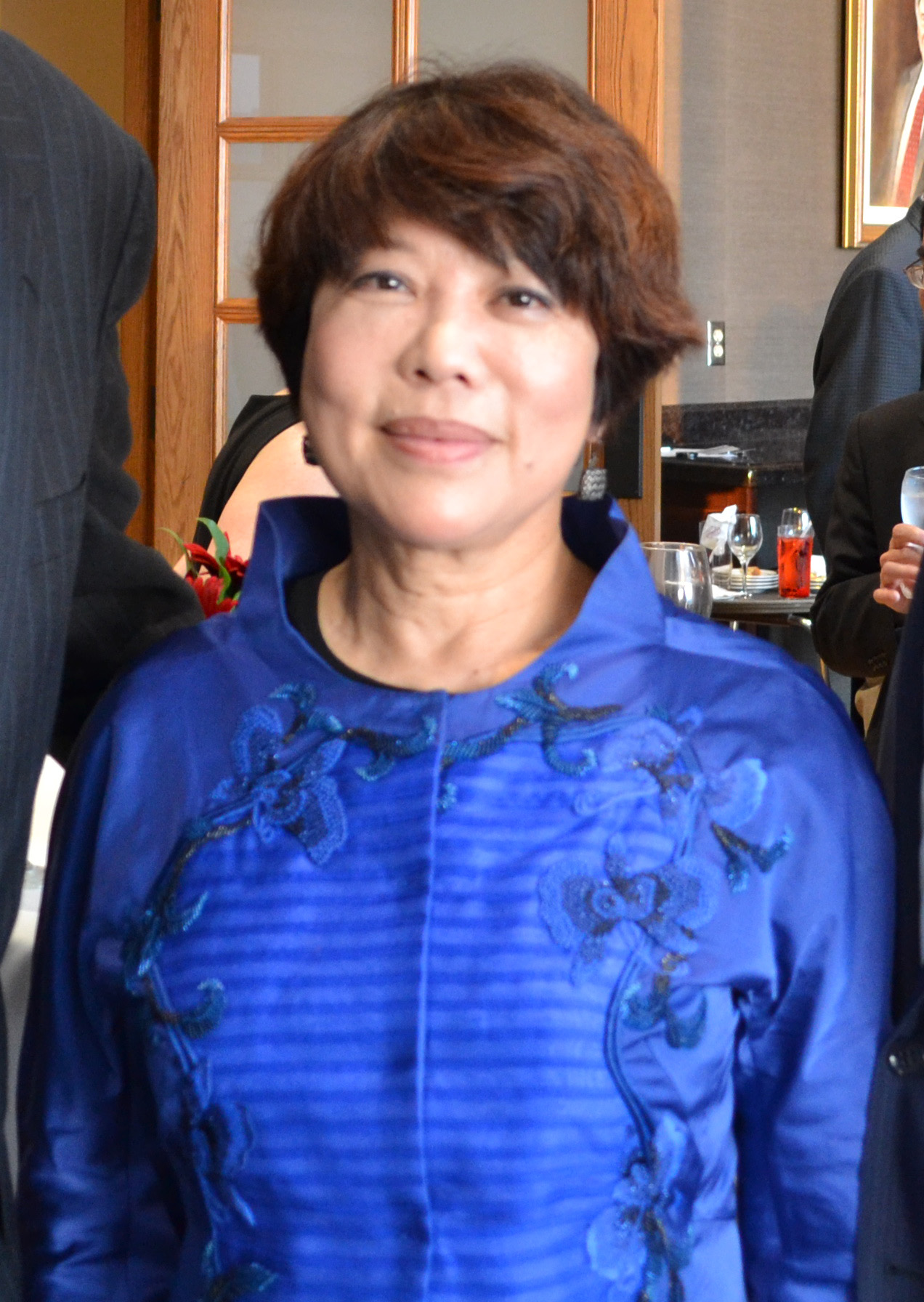
Nancy Chang (2012)

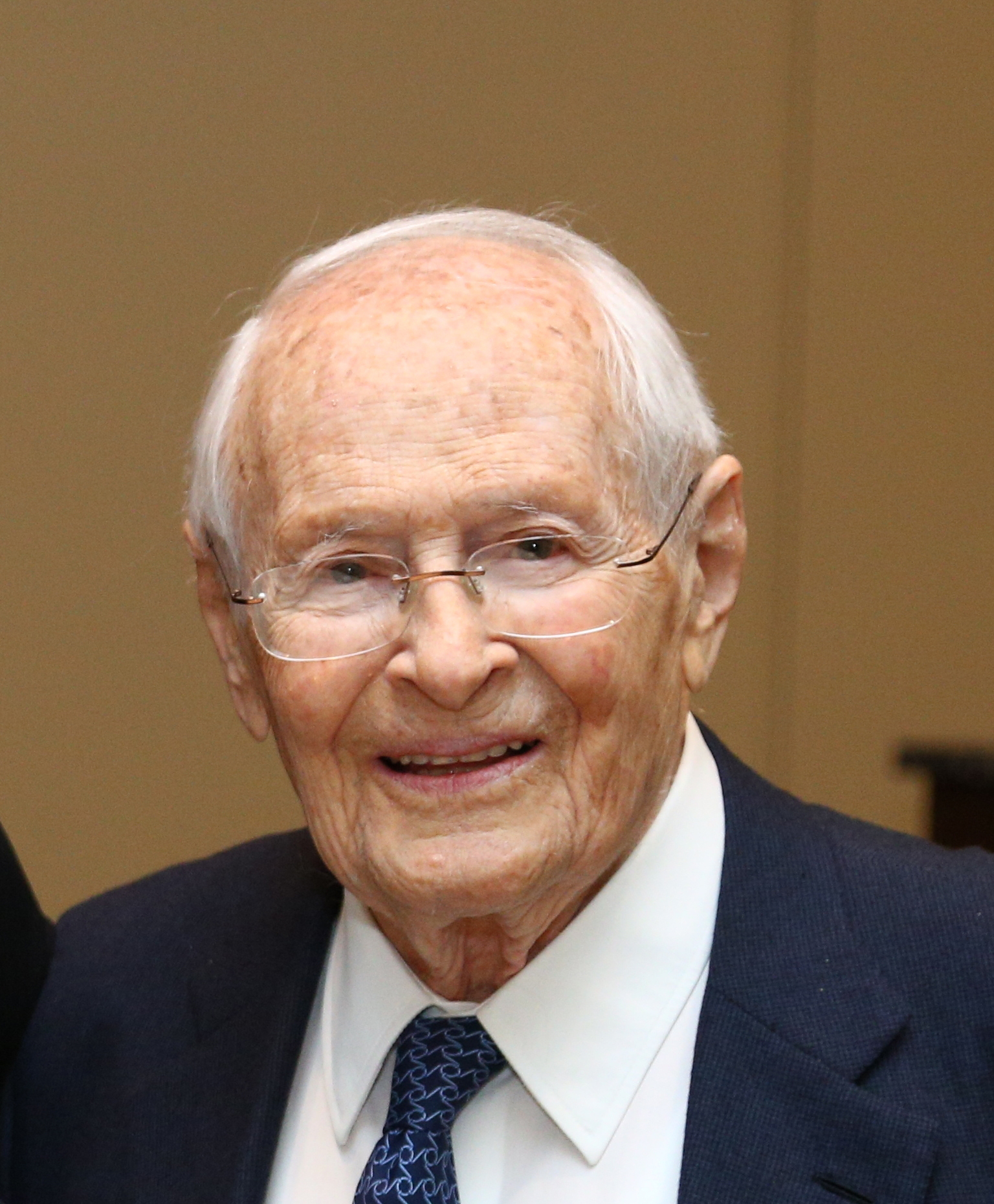
George Rosenkranz (2013)

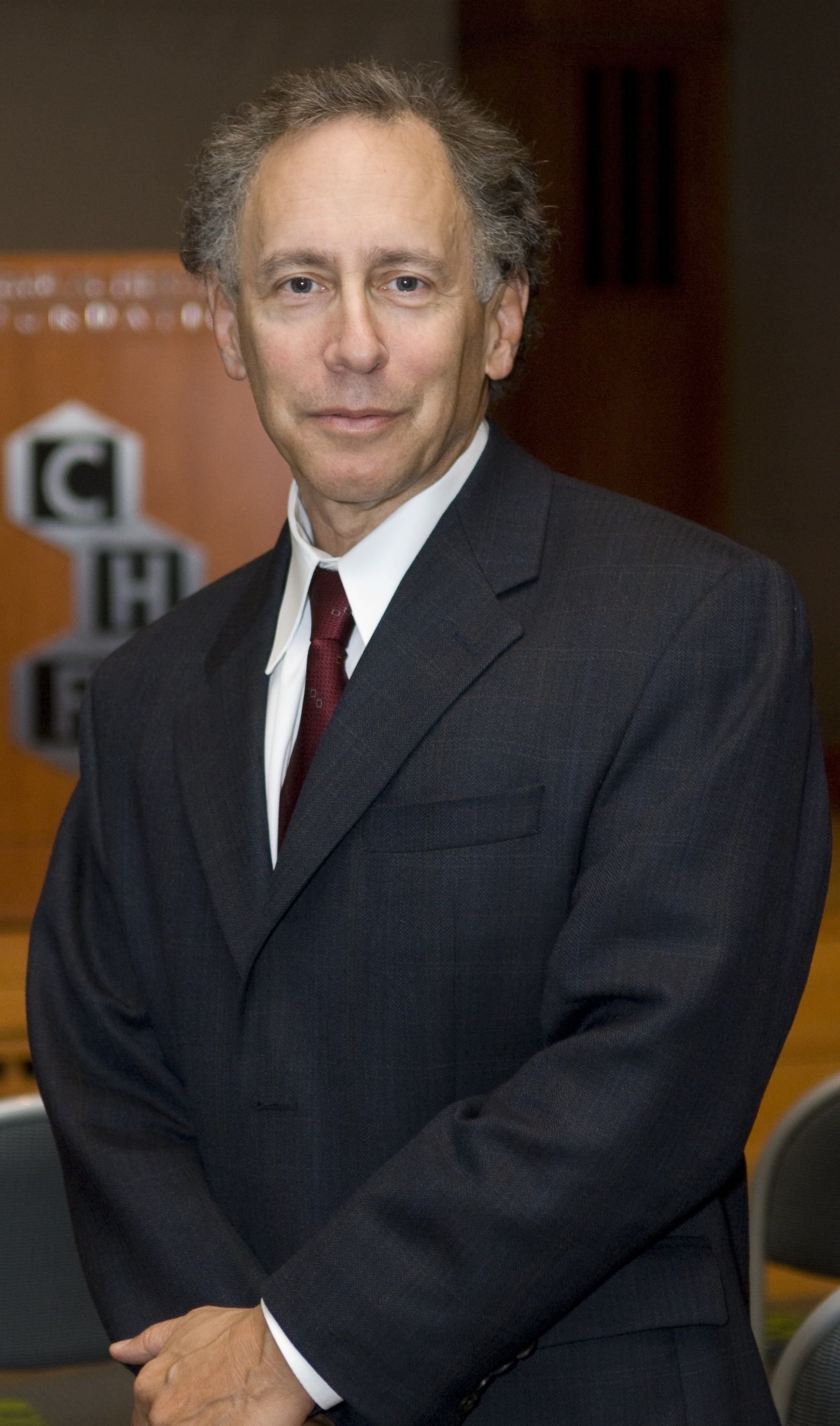
Robert Langer (2014;
photo from 2008)

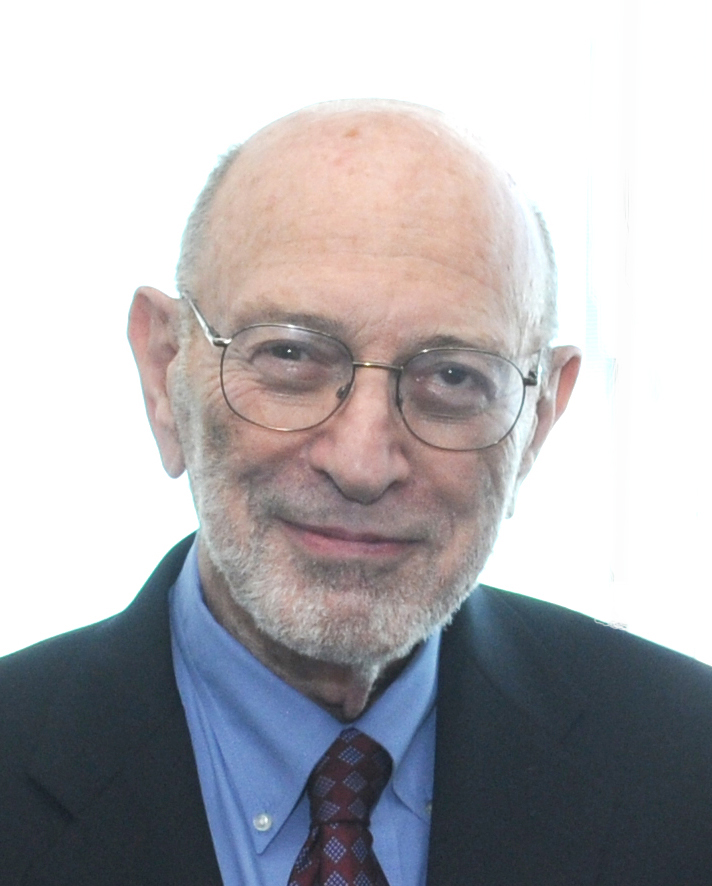
Stanley Norman Cohen (2016)

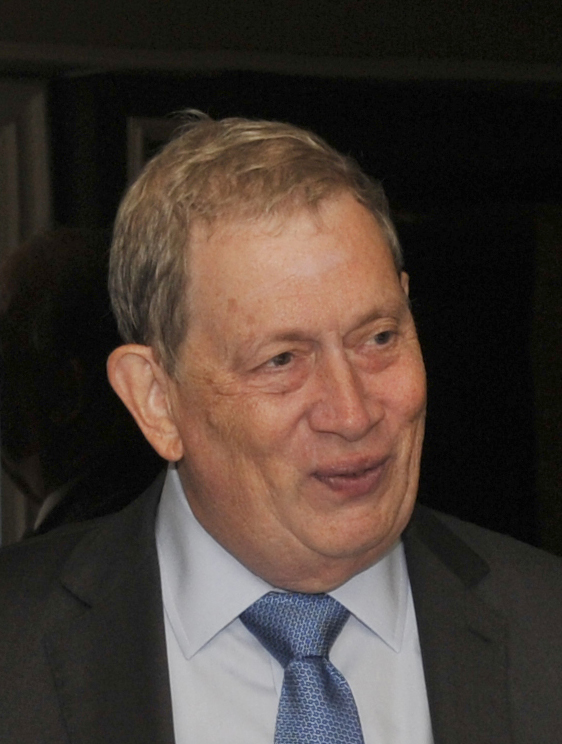
John C. Martin (2017)

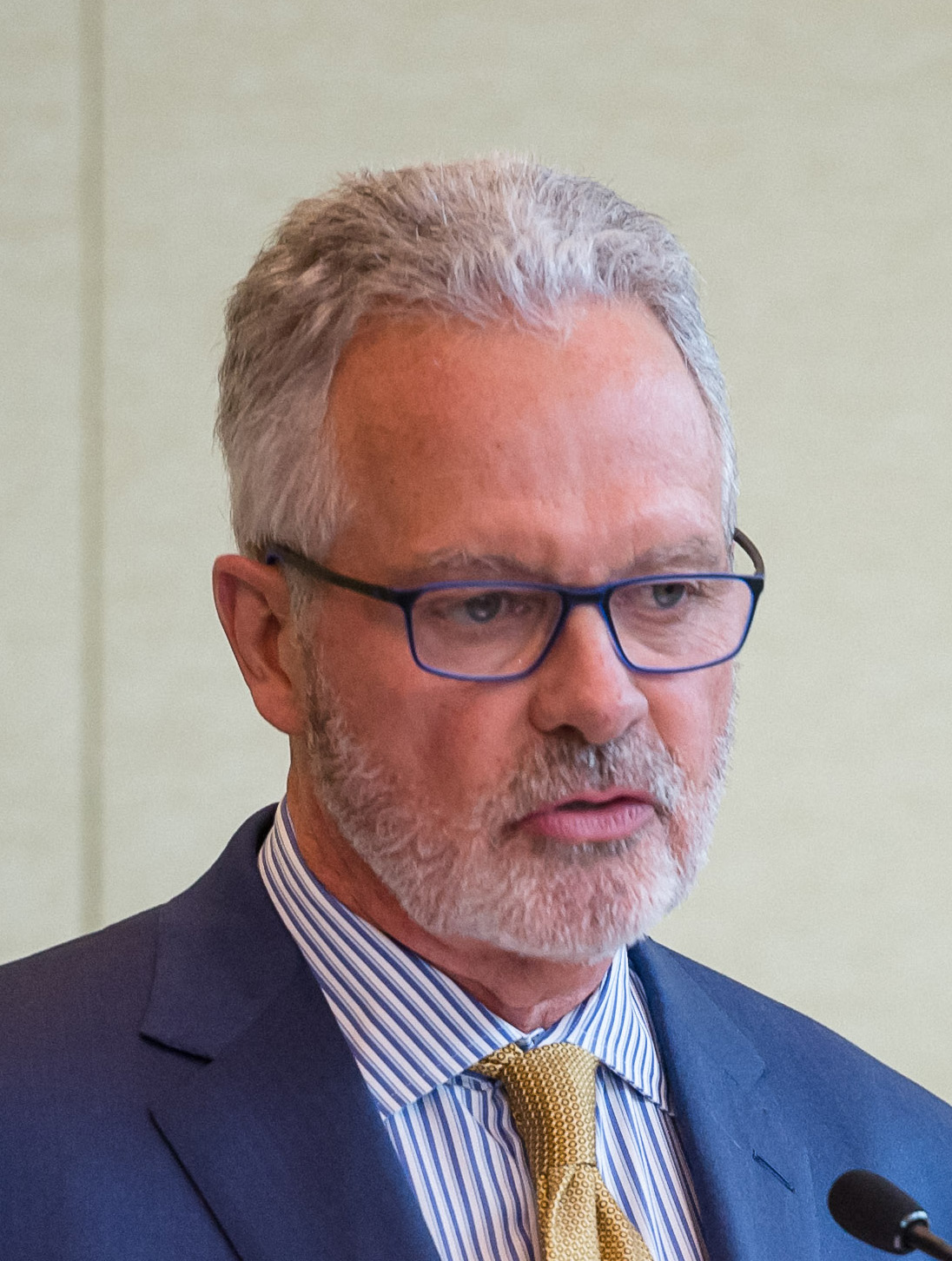
William Rastetter (2018)

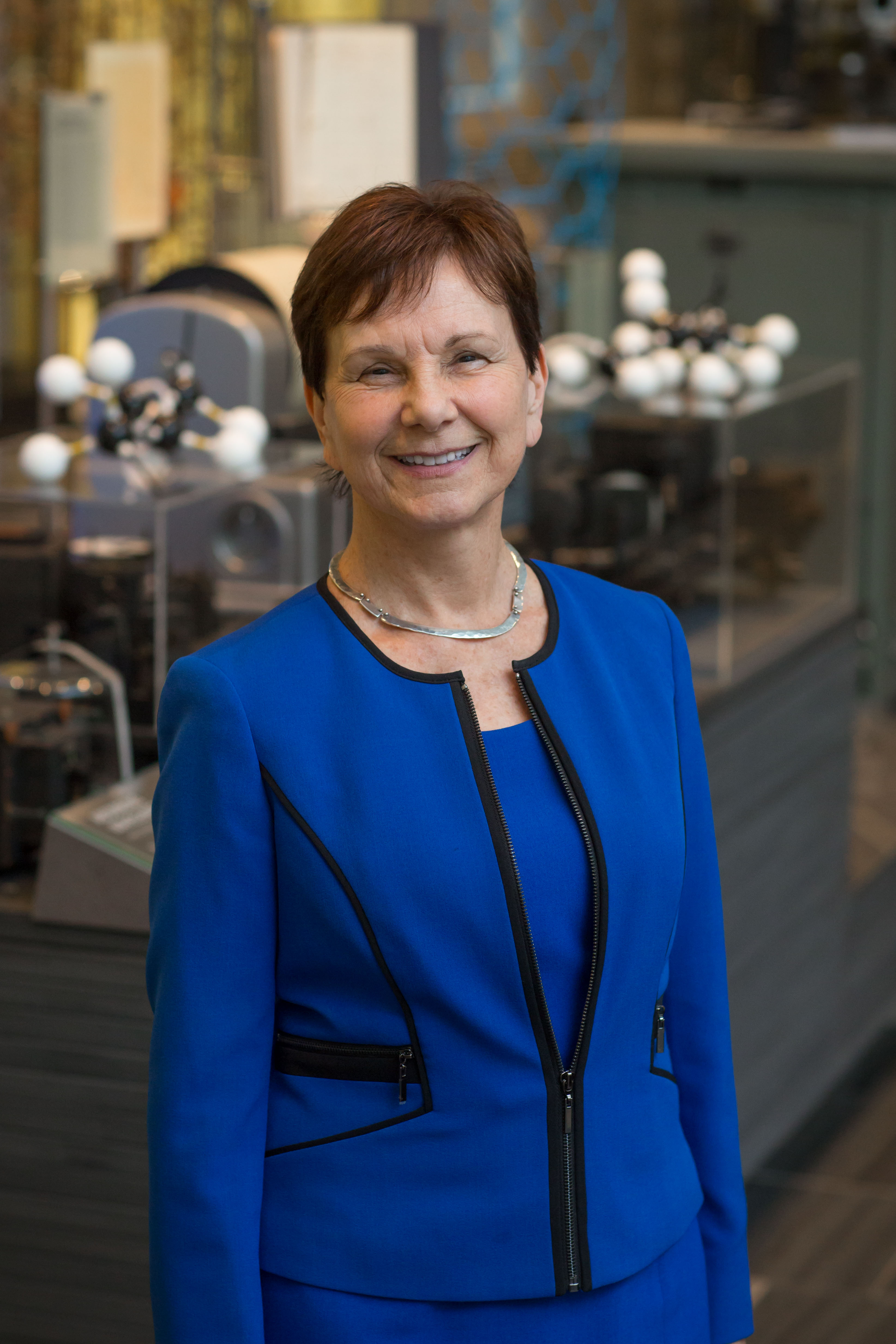
Janet Woodcock (2019)

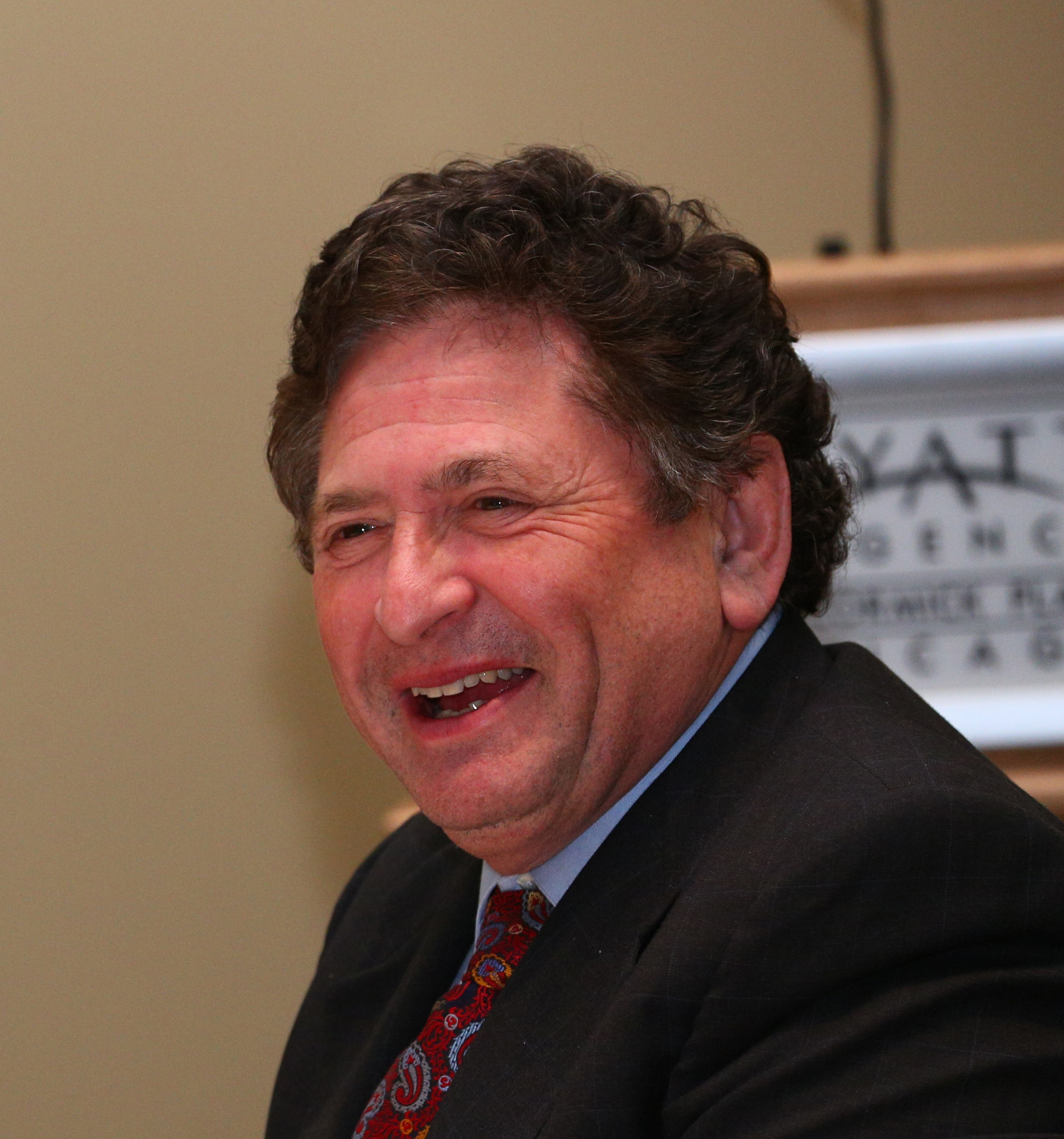
Ivor Royston (photo from 2013)

External videos
- “Thirty Years of Venture Capitalism in Biotechnology”, Award to Moshe Alafi and William K. Bowes, 2015, at the Chemical Heritage Foundation (now the Science History Institute)

== See also ==
- List of biology awards
