= Bob Wright =

American businessman

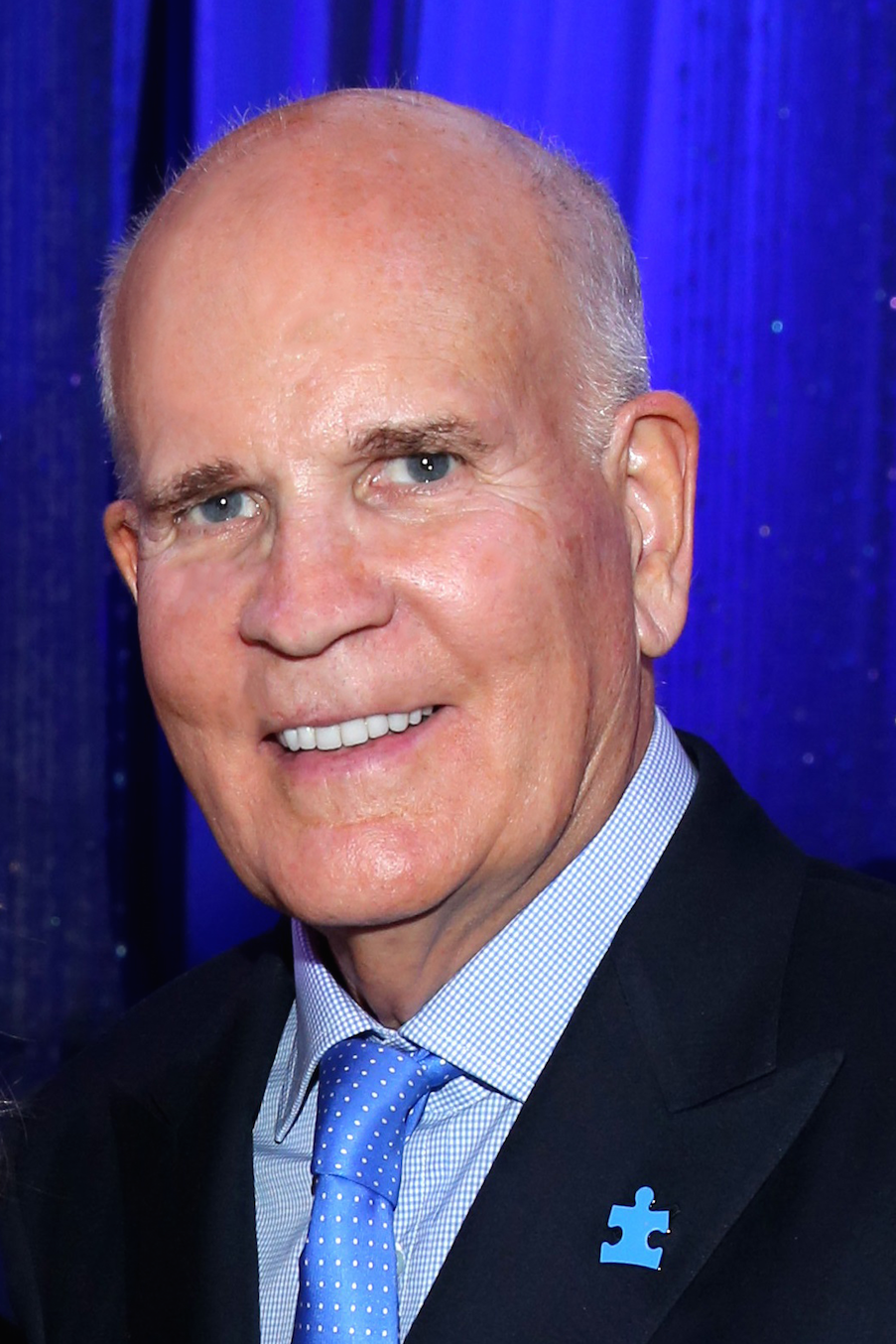
- Wright in 2015
- Born: Robert Charles Wright; April 23, 1943 (age 83); Hempstead, New York, U.S.
- Education: College of the Holy Cross (BA); University of Virginia (LLB)
- Occupations: Lawyer; businessman; author
- Known for: Cox Cable; NBC; NBC Universal; General Electric; Autism Speaks; The Suzanne Wright Foundation; HARPA
- Board member of: Polo Ralph Lauren; AMC Networks; New York-Presbyterian Hospital (life trustee); Palm Beach Civic Association (Chairman and CEO)
- Spouses: Suzanne Wright (m. 1967; died 2016) Susan Keenan Wright (m. 2017)
- Children: 3

Robert Charles Wright (born April 23, 1943) is an American lawyer, businessman, and author. He was the president and chief executive officer (CEO) of the National Broadcasting Company (NBC) from 2001 until he retired in 2007.

Wright has been credited with overseeing NBC's expansion into a media conglomerate and leading the company to record earnings in the 1990s. Prior to NBC, he held several posts at General Electric in the 1960s, 70s and 80s. He was president and CEO of GE Capital, GE Financial Services, from 1983 to 1986 and GE's vice chairman until he retired from that role in 2008.

In 2005, Wright and his wife, Suzanne Wright, founded Autism Speaks. In 2016, after his wife's death from pancreatic cancer, Wright established the Suzanne Wright Foundation, which funds research for pancreatic cancer. Through the Suzanne Wright Foundation, he led the initiative to establish a Health Advanced Research Projects Agency, or HARPA, a government research agency modeled after the U.S. Department of Defense's DARPA. On March 15, 2022, Public Law 117-103 was enacted authorizing the establishment of ARPA-H within the U.S. Department of Health and Human Services.

== Early life and education ==
Wright was born on April 23, 1943, in Hempstead, New York, and was raised on Long Island. He was the only child of Catherine Drum Wright and Gerald Franklin Wright. His mother was a teacher, and his father worked as a contractor.

Wright attended Chaminade High School in Mineola, New York. During high school, he played junior-varsity football and participated in speech and debate competitions. After graduation, he was admitted to the College of the Holy Cross and Georgetown University, ultimately choosing to enroll at Holy Cross.

As an undergraduate, Wright initially entered a pre-medical program at Holy Cross, which included courses in Greek and Latin as well as the pre-medical curriculum. He was elected treasurer of the student body, ran unsuccessfully for class president, and joined the college's Purple Key Society. He graduated from Holy Cross with a Bachelor of Arts in psychology and history in 1965. Under the influence of Edward Bennett Williams, he then earned his Bachelor of Laws (LL.B.) from the University of Virginia School of Law in 1968.

== Career ==
=== Early career ===
Wright began his career with General Electric as a staff lawyer in 1969. The following year, he left GE to take a judicial clerkship for a federal judge in New Jersey. Wright joined GE again in 1973 as a lawyer for the company's plastics unit, where he later took on several management positions. GE made a deal to acquire radio, broadcast TV and cable properties of Atlanta, Georgia-based Cox Communications in 1979 and appointed Wright as Cox Cable president and executive vice president of Cox Broadcasting. The deal did not come to fruition, however Wright remained with Cox Cable as president until 1983. Under Wright's leadership, Cox Cable launched franchises across the U.S., including franchises in Omaha, Nebraska, Tucson, Arizona, New Orleans, Louisiana, Vancouver, Washington, suburbs near Chicago, Illinois, and Providence, Rhode Island, and a portion of Long Island, New York. Wright was a contemporary of Ted Turner (Turner Broadcasting Systems), John Malone (TCI), Chuck Dolan (Cablevision Systems) and Ralph J. Roberts (Comcast) during the early days of cable television. Wright left Cox to join GE once again in 1983, when GE chairman and CEO Jack Welch hired him to lead the company's housewares and audio units. He was promoted to president of GE Financial Services from 1984 to 1986.

=== NBC and NBC Universal ===
GE named Wright the president and CEO of the National Broadcasting Company when the company acquired the broadcast network in 1986. He succeeded Grant Tinker in the role. He became chairman and CEO of NBC in 2001. He was named chairman and CEO of NBC Universal in 2004.

Upon succeeding Tinker, Wright's main mission became finding new areas of business in addition to running a television network, and transformed the network into a media conglomerate. NBC launched CNBC in 1989 and MSNBC in 1996. Both are examples of the strategic partnerships NBC created under Wright to improve distribution and content. CNBC included a partnership with Dow Jones allowing delivery of local business and financial news in Europe and Asia; and MSNBC was a venture with Microsoft that launched a new 24-hour news network and accompanying news website to combine the two mediums.

Wright is credited with leading NBC during a time when the company became a powerful media leader, driving the company to record earnings in the 1990s. The network reported $5 billion in revenues and nearly more $1 billion in operating profits in 1996. Also under Wright, NBC acquired Universal Pictures, Telemundo and Bravo.

In the early- and mid-90s, Wright and NBC led efforts to persuade lawmakers and regulators to relax rules preventing networks from becoming multichannel program providers, obtaining certain financial interests and syndication.

General Electric named Wright as vice chairman of NBC's then-parent company in 2000.

Under Wright, NBC completed its acquisition of Vivendi Universal Entertainment in 2004. Led by Wright, the newly formed NBCUniversal controlled seven cable networks, including USA Network and Sci-Fi Channel); 29 TV stations; film and TV studios; and theme parks.

During his career with NBC, Wright was active in opposing digital piracy, and was a founding member of the Global Leadership Group for the Business Alliance to Stop Counterfeiting and Piracy. In that role, Wright spoke at the Global Congress on Combating Counterfeiting and Piracy in Geneva, Switzerland, pushing for lawmakers and businesses to curb rising intellectual property theft in the digital age, and delivered a speech titled "Technology and the Rule of Law in the Digital Age" at the Media Institute in 2004. He also penned an op-ed in The Wall Street Journal titled "Stop IP theft". Wright's speech at the Media Institute was published in the Notre Dame Journal of Law, Ethics & Public Policy. His 2002 speech for the Legatus Tri-State Chapter on issues of faith and business was reprinted in 50 High-Impact Speeches and Remarks.

Wright retired from NBC in 2007. When Wright first took the helm at the network, it saw operating profits of $400 million. In 2007, when he retired, NBC generated $3.1 billion in profit on $15.4 billion in revenue. He remained vice chairman of GE until his retirement from that role in 2008.

=== Autism Speaks ===
One of Wright's grandchildren was diagnosed with autism, prompting Wright and his wife, Suzanne, to found a nonprofit advocacy group. The couple set up Autism Speaks in 2005, and Wright became its chairman. The Wrights' organization merged with Autism Coalition for Research and Education in 2005, National Alliance for Autism Research (NAAR) in 2006 and Cure Autism Now in 2007.

The absorption of NAAR, whose leaders primarily advocated for research into genetic causes of autism, led to conflict with other members of Autism Speaks leadership, who prioritized research into environmental causes (including research into the discredited claim that vaccines caused autism). One of Wright's daughters, Katie—an outspoken anti-vaccine activist and the mother of Wright's autistic grandchild—publicly demanded the organization recognize a causal link between vaccines and autism and fund related research even more aggressively than it had been (demands that the organization did not concede to). According to autistic author and former Autism Speaks advisor John Elder Robison, "anti-vaccinationists" on the organization's executive board exerted significant influence over its research priorities, prompting frustration and resignations from those who favored a science-based approach. Anti-vaccine activist and Autism Speaks donor Barry Segal claimed that Wright "completely agreed" with his views during a private discussion the two had in 2011 and that Wright fired then-president Mark Roithmayr in 2012 at his suggestion. Autism Speaks officially maintained an "agnostic" stance on the issue of vaccines and autism until February 2015, when it issued a position statement formally accepting the scientific consensus that no such link existed and encouraging universal childhood vaccination. In an e-mail Wright sent to Autism Speaks leadership in September 2015, he criticized the position statement as "unnecessarily argumentative" and praised then presidential candidate Donald Trump for proposing alternative vaccine schedules as an accommodation for vaccine-hesitant parents during a televised Republican primary debate. Wright had known Trump for decades at the time the e-mail was sent and was primarily responsible for his interest in the debunked link between autism and vaccines.

In its first nine years, Autism Speaks invested a half-billion dollars, focusing on science and research. The organization helped persuade the U.S. government to invest billions in autism research; as of 2014, Congress had dedicated more than $3 billion for autism research and monitoring. The organization teamed up with Google in 2014 on the MSSNG project to sequence a database of autism genomes. Mssng has been criticized by some autistic individuals and advocates for using a title that implies autistic people are incomplete, excluding the autistic community from the decision-making process, and spending money on research unlikely to have any impact on the lives of autistic people in the near future. Some autistic individuals and advocates have also labeled the project eugenic and claimed its primary goal is to develop a cure or prenatal test for autism, characterizations Autism Speaks has disputed. One of the organization's stated goals during Wright's tenure as chairman was to cure autistic people; it removed the word "cure" from its mission statement in 2016.

Wright resigned as chairman of Autism Speaks in May 2015, but remained on its board of directors until January 2018. His book, The Wright Stuff: from NBC to Autism Speaks, written with Diane Mermigas, was published March 29, 2016.

=== The Suzanne Wright Foundation ===
Bob Wright is Founder and Chairman of the Suzanne Wright Foundation, established in honor of his late wife, Suzanne, who died from pancreatic cancer on July 29, 2016. The Suzanne Wright Foundation launched CodePurple, a national awareness and advocacy campaign to fight pancreatic cancer. Pancreatic cancer has the highest mortality rate of all major cancers. With no screening tools, the mortality rate is 92% and has seen virtually no improvement in more than 40 years. Through advocacy and awareness, the foundation's goal was to accelerate discovery of detection tools, better treatments, and ultimately, a cure for pancreatic cancer.

The Suzanne Wright Foundation proposed a national health policy initiative to establish HARPA, the Health Advanced Research Projects Agency. HARPA would exist with HHS and leverage federal research assets and private sector tools to drive medical breakthroughs for diseases, like pancreatic cancer, that have not benefited from the current system.

On May 22, 2018, The Suzanne Wright Foundation premiered their film The Patients Are Waiting: How HARPA Will Change Lives, in New York City. The film screening was followed by a panel hosted by Maria Bartiromo, Anchor and Global Markets Editor, FOX Business Network – FOX News Channel. Panelists included Bob Wright, Dr. Herbert Pardes, Executive Vice Chairman of NewYork–Presbyterian Hospital; Former Director NIMH, Dr. Geoffrey Ling, Col. (Ret.) Prof. of Neurology, Johns Hopkins; Founder & Former Director, DARPA BTO, Jessica Morris, Co-founder of OurBrainBank, and Karen Reeves, President & CMO, AZTherapies.

On March 15, 2022, Public Law 117-103 was enacted authorizing the establishment of ARPA-H within the U.S. Department of Health and Human Services.

=== Lee Equity Partners ===
Lee Equity Partners, a private equity firm run by financier Thomas H. Lee, announced in January 2008 that Wright would join the company as a senior advisor. Due to Wright's background with GE Financial Services and NBC, Wright was brought on to advise in media and financial sector deals.

=== Boards and affiliations ===
Wright has served on numerous boards, councils and committees. As of February 2016, he sits on the board of directors for Polo Ralph Lauren; AMC Networks; Alfred E. Smith Memorial Foundation; and Palm Beach Fellowship of Christians & Jews. He is chairman and CEO of Palm Beach Civic Association. He is a life trustee of the New York-Presbyterian Hospital.

== Honors and awards ==
Wright has accepted various awards and honors during his career in media. He was inducted into the Broadcasting & Cable Hall of Fame in 1996, the Cable Center's Cable Hall of Fame in 2007 and AAF's Advertising Hall of Fame in 2009. He received the "Gold Medal Award" from International Radio & Television Society Foundation in 1997, the "Steven J. Ross Humanitarian of the Year Award" of UJA-Federation of New York in 1998, "Public Service Award" from the Ad Council in 2002, Broadcasters' Foundation's "Golden Mike Award" in 2003, Media Institute's 2004 "Freedom of Speech Award", "Humanitarian Award" from the Simon Wiesenthal Center in 2005, "Distinguished Leadership in Business Award" from Columbia Business School in 2005, and the "Visionary Award" from the Museum of Television & Radio in 2006. He also was awarded the Minorities in Broadcasting Training Program's "Striving for Excellence Award". Wright and his wife Suzanne have been honored for their work with Autism Speaks. They were presented with the first-ever "Double Helix Medal" for Corporate Leadership from Cold Spring Harbor Laboratory, the New York University "Child Advocacy Award", the Castle Connolly "National Health Leadership Award" and the American Ireland Fund "Humanitarian Award". They received the "Dean's Medal" from the Johns Hopkins Bloomberg School of Public Health, the "President's Medal for Excellence" at Boston College's Wall Street Council Tribute Dinner and the "Visionary Award" at the 20th Annual Nantucket Film Festival. The Wrights were named among Time's 100 most influential people in the world in 2008.

== Bibliography ==
- Wright, Bob; Mermigas, Diane (2016). The Wright Stuff: From NBC to Autism Speaks. RosettaBooks. ISBN 978-0-7953-4692-7.

== Personal life ==
Wright was married to his wife Suzanne from 1967 until her death from pancreatic cancer in 2016. He has three children. He married his second wife, Susan Goldwater Keenan, on Sept. 30, 2017.

== See also ==
- The Late Shift
