= Yeshiva University Center for Israel Studies =

- Established: 2006
- Administrative staff: Steven Fine, Director; Joshua Karlip, Associate Director
- Location: Manhattan, New York, USA
- Campus: Yeshiva University, Wilf Campus
- Website: www.yu.edu/cis

The Yeshiva University Center for Israel Studies (מרכז ללימודי ישראל) reflects the longstanding relationship between Yeshiva University and Israel. It supports research, conferences, publications, museum exhibitions, public programs and educational opportunities that enhance awareness and study of Israel in all of its complexities. The center is led by Director Steven Fine, Professor of Jewish History at Yeshiva University, and Associate Director Joshua Karlip, Professor of Jewish History at Yeshiva University.

== Overview ==
The Yeshiva University Center for Israel Studies is housed on Yeshiva University's historic Wilf Campus in Washington Heights, Manhattan and on the Yeshiva University Israel campus in Jerusalem. Its support for research, conferences, publications, museum exhibitions, public programs and educational opportunities that enhance awareness and study of Israel has research, conferences, publications, museum exhibitions, public programs and educational opportunities that enhance awareness and study of Israel has led it to become a national and an international forum for engagement of the political, social, scientific, economic, historical, religious and cultural significance of Israel in the world community.

== Major Projects ==
=== Arch of Titus Digital Restoration Project ===
==== Overview ====
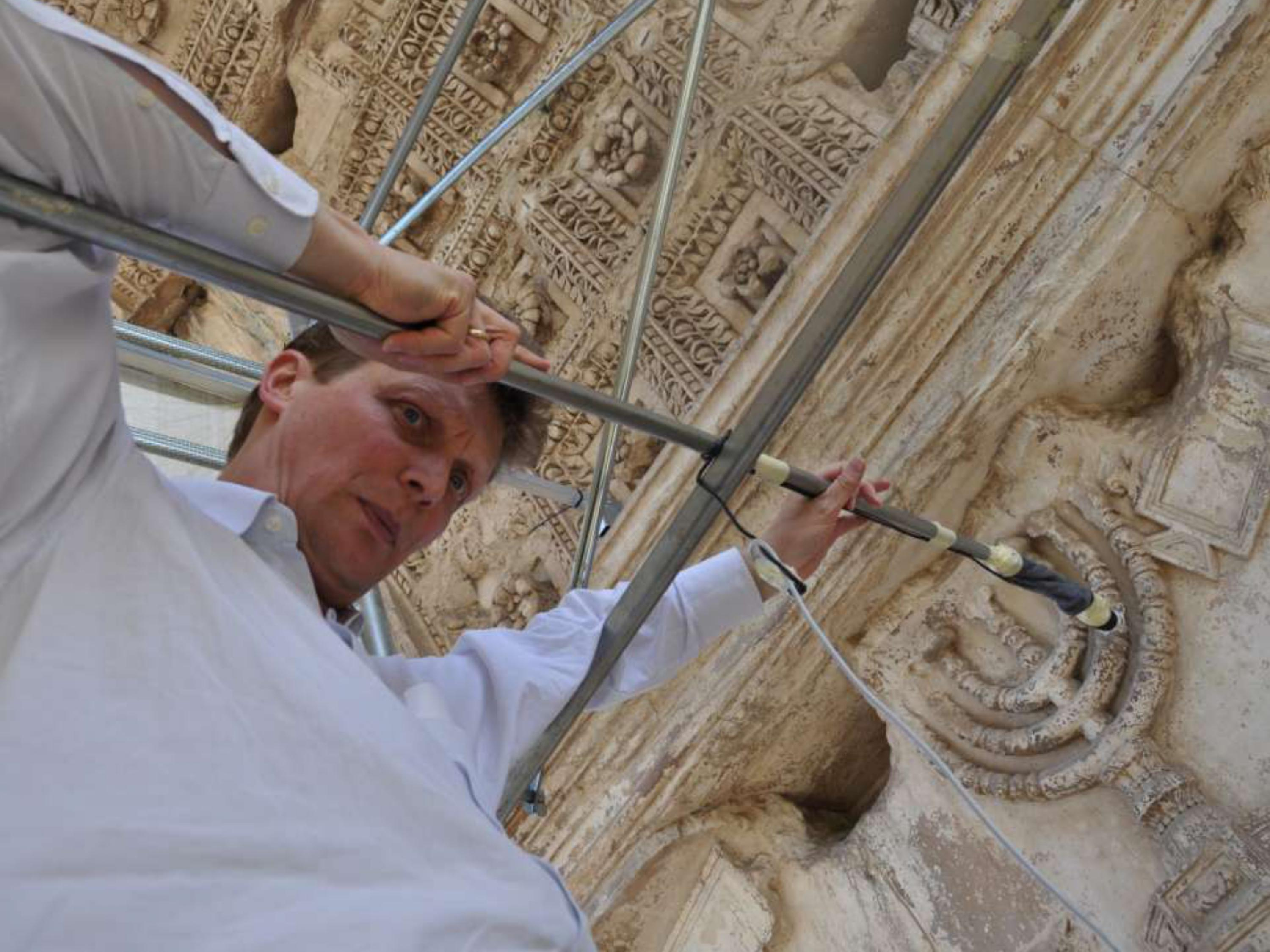
Scanning the Arch of Titus for color

The Arch of Titus in Rome commemorates the Emperor Titus’ victory in the Jewish War (66-73 CE). This iconic monument contains bas reliefs of Titus’ triumphal procession through Rome, including a depiction of the seven-branched menorah from the Jerusalem Temple. Long significant for Christian art, this menorah is the symbol of modern Israel. Like the other reliefs on the Arch, the original colors of the menorah relief are no longer visible. New conservation techniques have successfully recovered traces of the original colors on ancient monuments. Noninvasive UV-VIS Absorption Spectrometry was employed to the Arch for the first time to capture traces of pigments on the relief, and 3D scanning was used for the first time to capture the geometric detail of the relief. Using these methods, the first reconstruction of the polychromy of the relief was created, resulting in highly accurate and detailed 3D models of the Arch. It was discovered that the Arch was originally vibrantly colored, much like other works from the time period.

==== Significance ====
Recent scholarship has focused on the significance of polychromy in classical art and architecture. This was the first study to restore the color on a monument from the Flavian period. This project also gave us our first glimpse of the colors used to decorate the sacred vessels of the Jerusalem Temple. Given the importance of the Arch of Titus as a Flavian Roman monument and of Temple and its menorah in Judaism and Christianity, the project transformed the way scholars visualize and conceptualize Roman state architecture as well as the central monument of ancient Judaism, the Jerusalem Temple.

==== Participants ====
An international team of art historians, conservators and historians assembled to study the reliefs of the Arch of Titus in all of their complexity. A technology team headed by co-director Bernard Frischer focused on the technical retrieval of evidence of polychromy, scanning of the reliefs and 3D digital modeling of the Arch. A team led by co-director Peter Schertz focused on the Roman context of the Arch, including the topographical, artistic and political issues that naturally arise in any study of the monument. Director Steven Fine will oversaw the entire project and lead a team dedicated to the interpretation of the Arch within Jewish and Christian contexts, from antiquity to the present.

==== Team Members ====
Steven Fine, Yeshiva University, Project Director Bernard Frischer, PublicVR, co-director, Senior Scientist Peter Schertz, Virginia Museum of Fine Arts, Project Co-director Louis H. Feldman, Yeshiva University Paolo Liverani, University of Florence Heinrich Piening, State of Bavaria Lawrence H. Schiffman, Yeshiva University William Stenhouse, Yeshiva University

=== Samaritans Project ===
==== Overview ====
The Samaritans: A Biblical People is a multi-media examination of the Samaritan Israelites, their world and their place in both Western Civilization and Jewish History. It presents notable artifacts from Samaritan history, including paintings, manuscripts, ancient books, photographs, ritual objects and significant archaeological discoveries from Greece, Italy and Israel. Its media installations and presentations attempt to reflect the complexities of the Samaritan experience and its relevance today.

==== "The Samaritans: A Biblical People" (".השומרונים: עדה. תורה. הר") ====
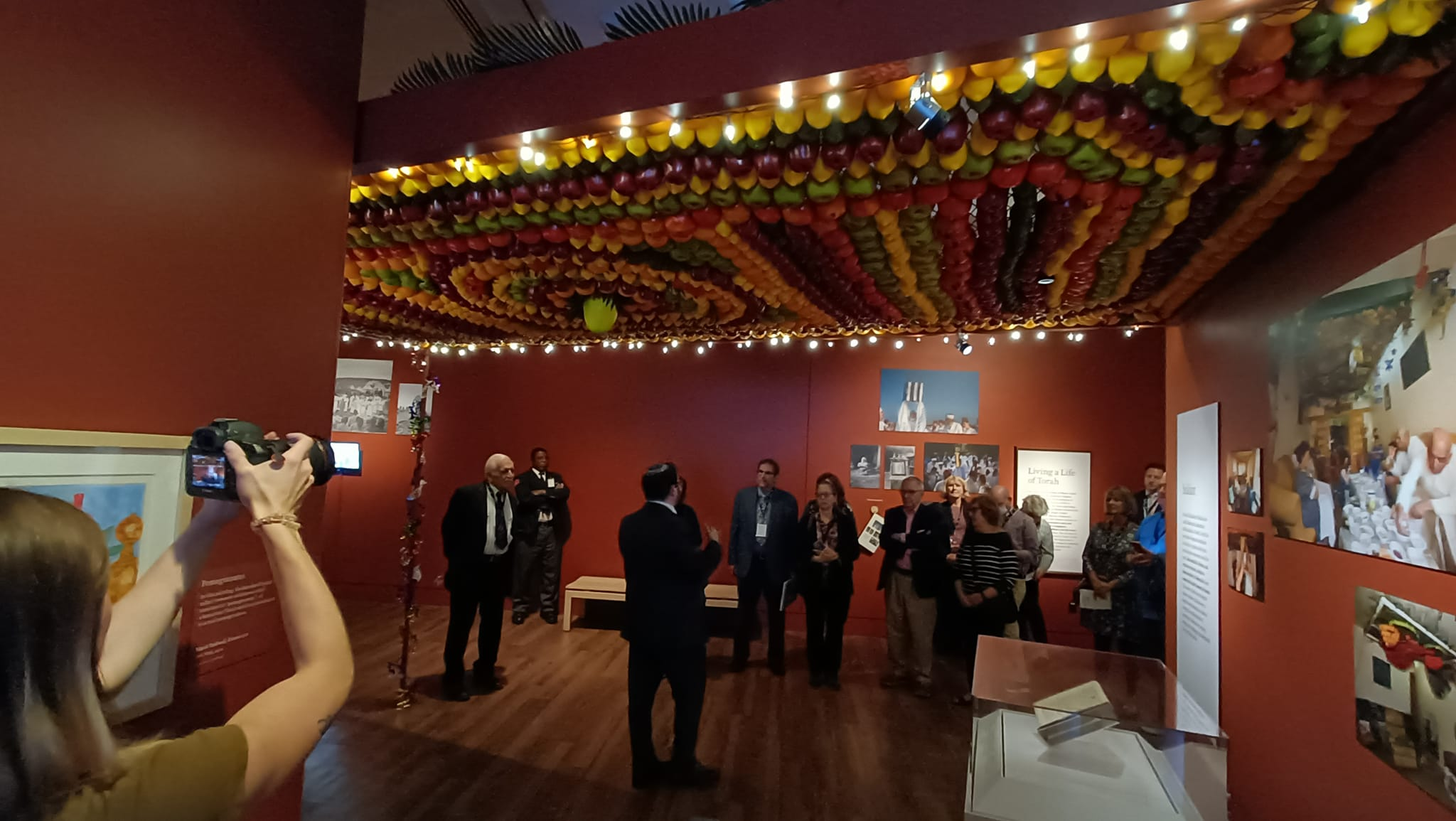
An example of a Samaritan Sukkah at the exhibit

The centerpiece of the Samaritan Project is the a documentary titled "The Samaritans: A Biblical People" (".השומרונים:עדה. תורה. הר"). This full length film, produced by Moshe Alafi in conjunction with the Center for Israel Studies, is an in-depth look at the daily lives of members of the modern day Samaritan community, their relationships, and their struggles.

==== Museum of the Bible Exhibition ====
Opened in September 2022, the Museum of the Bible is hosting an exhibition titled "The Samaritans: A Biblical People," in conjunction with the Center for Israel Studies. The exhibition features a combination of a comprehensive collection of Samaritan artifacts and manuscripts, a recreation of a Samaritan sukkah, and unique videos produced for this event, all of which help shine a light on the unique Samaritan culture.

== Other Activities ==
=== Conferences and Symposia ===
The Center for Israel Studies strives to host international conferences and symposia that bring together renowned scholars with YU faculty and students. These conferences are at the core of Center for Israel Studies' activities.

==== Select List of Notable Conferences ====
The Temple of Jerusalem: From Moses to the Messiah. With YU Museum. Organizer: Steven Fine. YU Museum and Wilf Campus, May, 2008.

Israel and India: A Relationship Comes of Age. VIP reception at the Indian consulate, associated exhibition on the Jews of India at YU Museum. With the Institute for Public Health and YU Museum. YU Museum, March 30, 2009.

Zionism on the Jewish Street: Geography and Nationalism at the Turn of the 20th Century. With YU Museum. Organizer: Jess Olson (Jewish History). YU Museum and Wilf Campus, March, 2010.

US-Israel Relations in the Era of Obama and Netanyahu. With the Begin-Sadat Center, Bar Ilan University and American Friends of BIU. Organizers: R. Bevan, E. Resnick. YU Museum, Sept, 15, 2009.

Jews and Power in the 20th Century. With the Schottenstein Honors Program and the Schneier Center for International Affairs, Yeshiva University. Primary faculty advisors: S. Fine, R. Bevan. YU Wilf Campus, Spring, 2009.

Symposium on Priesthood in the Second Temple Period, 11/11/09. Organizer: Joseph Angel (Jewish History).

National Association of Professors of Hebrew Annual Meeting at YU, July 2010. Co-sponsored with Stern College, Chair: Tzefirah Cohen, Stern College.

Israel and Iran: From Cyrus the Great to the Islamic Republic. With the Schneir Center for International Affairs, Yeshiva University. Organizer: Daniel Tsadik. YU Museum, September, 2010.

Talmuda De'Eretz Yisrael: Archaeology and the Rabbis in Late Antiquity. Organizers: Steven Fine (Jewish History), Aaron Koller (Bible). With YU Museum. YU Museum and Wilf Campus, March 2011.

Torah and Science Conference. With Bar Ilan and Machon Lev. Apr 2009, 2010, 2011. Hosted at the YU Israel campus, 2010.

Folktales of Israel: A Festival Honoring Professor Peninnah Schram. With YU Museum and Stern College for Women. YU Museum, November, 2011.

Religious Zionism in America: A Yom Iyyun Honoring Professors Bernard Rosensweig and Sol Roth, April 22, 2012.

=== Publications ===
The CIS is dedicated to disseminating the knowledge cultivated by our affiliated faculty, conferences and programming

The Temple of Jerusalem: From Moses to the Messiah, Studies in Honor of Louis H. Feldman Steven Fine, ed, (Leiden: E.J. Brill, 2011). Articles were edited by a team of Yeshiva College, Stern College and Bernard Revel Graduate School of Jewish Studies students.

Shoshsnat Yakov: Studies in Honor of Professor Yakov Elman. Steven Fine and Shai Secunda eds. Contracted to E.J. Brill Publishers, submission Summer, 2012.

Catalog of Samaritan Manuscripts in the Yeshiva University Mendel Gottesman Library, Benyamim Tsedeka, ed. 2012.

Israel and Iran: From Cyrus the Great to the Islamic Republic. Daniel Tsadik, ed. Contracted to E.J. Brill Publishers.

Talmuda De'Eretz Yisrael: Archaeology and the Rabbis in Late Antiquity. Steven Fine and Aaron Koller, eds. Contracted with DeGruyters.

=== Museum exhibitions ===
Exhibitions are another way of bringing YU scholarship to a wide audience. The CIS has co-sponsored a wide array of Yeshiva University Museum exhibitions and is involved in outside projects at major New York institutions:

The Samaritans: A Biblical People. Exhibition at The Museum of Biblical Art (MOBIA), New York, NY. Curator: Steven Fine (Jewish History). Research Associate, Yitzchak Schwartz (CIS). Fall, 2014.

Imagining the Temple: The Models of Leen Ritmeyer. Exhibition at YU Museum. Curators: Rhoda Seidenberg (YU Museum), Steven Fine (Jewish History). Spring, 2008.

From Malabar and Beyond: The Jews of India, Exhibition at YU Museum. In conjunction with CIS conference, Israel and India: A Relationship Comes of Age. Curator: Rhoda Seidenberg (YU Museum). Fall, 2009.

== Faculty Working Groups ==
Working groups of Faculty involve the collaboration of scholars from diverse fields for publication of research work and organizing public events. These groups, which are constituted from different locations of the university, facilitate CIS academic program development.

=== International Conferences ===
Israel and International Relations Evan Resnick (Political Science), Ruth Bevan (Political Science), Daniel Tsadik (Jewish History).

Jews and Power in the 20th Century, with the Schottenstein Honor's Program and the Schneier Center for International Affairs, Yeshiva University. Primary faculty advisors: S. Fine, R. Bevan. Spring, 2009.

US-Israel Relations in the Era of Obama and Netanyahu, with the Begin-Sadat Center, Bar Ilan University and American Friends of BIU. Organizers: R. Bevan, E. Resnick. Sept, 15, 2009.

Israel and Iran: From Cyrus the Great to the Islamic Republic. Organizer: Daniel Tsadik. With the Schneir Center for International Affairs, Yeshiva University. September, 2010.

Art and the Israeli Experience Chair: Norman Adler (University Professor, Psychology)

Torah and Science Conference. With Bar Ilan and Machon Lev. Apr 2009, 2010, 2011. Hosted at the YUI campus, 2010.

Jews and Judaism in Late Antiquity Chairs: Steven Fine (Jewish History), Yakov Elman (Jewish History)

Talmuda De'Eretz Yisrael: Archaeology and the Rabbis in Late Antiquity. Organizers: Steven Fine (Jewish History), Aaron Koller (Bible). With YU Museum. At the YU Museum, March 2011.

=== Events ===
Lecture by Shulamit Laderman, Bar Ilan University, The Hebrew Alphabet in Jewish and Israeli Art. Stern College, Fall 2009.

Student Photography Contest, associated with the Student Arts Festival. Spring 2009 and 2010.

Religious Zionist Thought Chair: Shalom Carmy, (Jewish Thought)

Co-sponsorship with the Yeshiva University Center for Ethics: Kwame Anthony Appiah, Princeton University: Religious Identity as a Challenge to Modern Politics. Yeshiva College, Spring 2009.

Science in Israel Chair: Carl Feit (Biology).

Symposium on Priesthood in the Second Temple Period, 11/11/09. Organizer: Joseph Angel (Jewish History).
