= Biotechnology (disambiguation) =

Biotechnology is the use of living systems and organisms to develop or make products.

It may also refer to:

- Biotechnology engineering
- Biotechnology High School, a public high school in Freehold Township, New Jersey
- Biotechnology Industry Organization, an American trade organization
- Biotechnology Heritage Award, recognizes individuals who have made significant contributions to the development of biotechnology
