= List of cancer mortality rates in the United States =

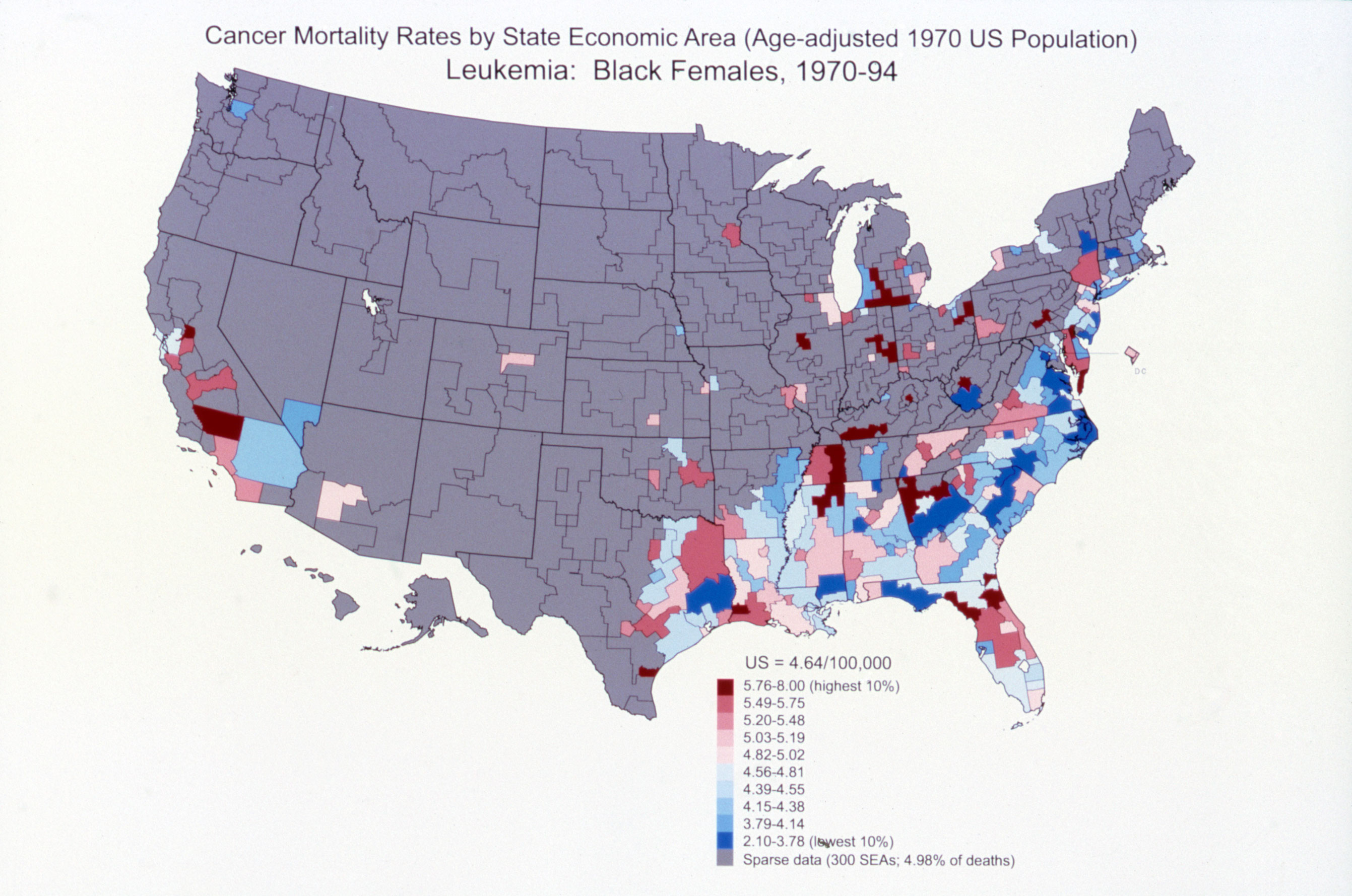
A map of age-adjusted mortality rates for leukaemia in black females in the US, 1970–94

Cancer mortality rates are determined by the relationship of a population's health and lifestyle with their healthcare system. In the United States during 2013–2017, the age-adjusted mortality rate for all types of cancer was 189.5/100,000 for males, and 135.7/100,000 for females. Below is an incomplete list of age-adjusted mortality rates for different types of cancer in the United States from the Surveillance, Epidemiology, and End Results program.

== Mortality rate ==
Type	Age-adjusted mortality rates per 100,000 people, 2013-2017
All Cancer	158.3
Oral cancer	0.0
Esophageal cancer	3.9
Stomach cancer	3.1
Colorectal cancer	13.9
Liver cancer and bile duct cancer	6.6
Gallbladder cancer	0.6
Pancreatic cancer	11.0
Laryngeal cancer	1.0
Lung cancer	40.2
Tracheal cancer (including other respiratory organs)	0.1
Bone cancer (including joint cancer)	0.5
Skin cancer (excluding basal and squamous)	3.4
Breast cancer (non-in situ)	11.3
Uterine cancer (cervix uteri)	1.2
Uterine cancer (corpus uteri)	1.2
Uterine cancer (not otherwise specified)	1.4
Ovarian cancer	3.8
Prostate cancer	7.8
Bladder cancer	4.4
Renal cancer (kidney and renal pelvis cancer)	3.7
Brain cancer	4.4
Thyroid cancer	0.5
Myeloma	3.3
Lymphoma	5.8
Leukemia	6.4

== See also ==
- Cancer survival rates
