= Moshe Alafi =

Israeli producer, director, and creator

- משה אלפי
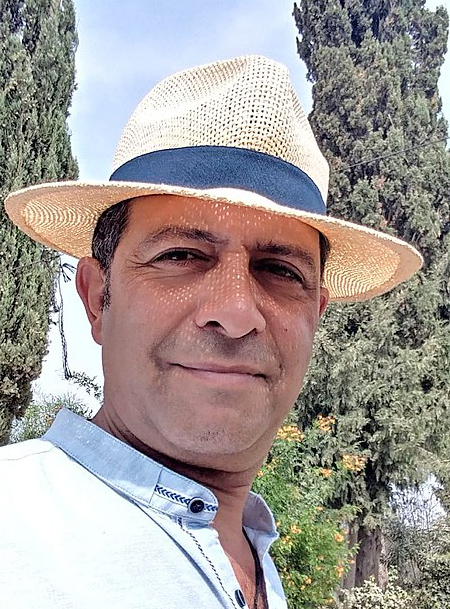
- Born: March 3, 1966 (age 59); Jerusalem

Moshe Alafi (Hebrew: משה אלפי; born March 3, 1966) is an Israeli film producer, director, and creator.

== Biography ==
Moshe was born in Jerusalem. In 1984, Alafi moved to Yeshivat Or Etzion, where he studied for several years under the tutelage of Rabbi Chaim Druckman. He did his army service in the Hesder program as a platoon sergeant in the Givati Brigade. After completing his army service in 1988, Alafi continued his studies in the "kollel" of the Yeshiva while living in Kiryat Malachi. He performed his reserve duty service in military engineering.

In 1990, Alafi began his studies in directing and producing for television at the Torah Institute for Education and Communications, where he would meet his future mentor and collaborator, Adir Zik. They would go on to collaborate on many projects, including a film about Zerach Warhaftig's activities during the Holocaust, a show at the Burnt House and coverage and broadcasts of the Israeli elections.

Moshe Alafi completed his Bachelor's degree in Communication and Business Administration at Champlain College, and Art studies at the Open University of Israel in Tel Aviv.

From 1990 to 1992, Alafi worked in educational television and Channel 1 as a researcher, and then at Channel 2 as a studio manager for educational programming. He simultaneously worked with industry figures such as Micha Shagrir, Dani Siton and Ayal Peled. Alafi began working as an instructor at Ma’aleh School of Television, Film and the Arts in 1993, and he is now the school's longest-serving instructor. He currently teaches courses in research and production; he previously taught studio production and was a final production project coach. Since 1995, he has served as, among other positions, the owner of Alafim Productions, which specializes in content creation for various clients across a variety of fields: documentaries and feature films, series and network series, festivals, tourism representatives, and films for museums in Israel and abroad.

Moshe Alafi resides in Abu Ghosh and is father to four children. He previously lived in Beit El, Jerusalem and Mevaseret Zion. He was diagnosed with cancer in 2015, from which he ultimately recovered.

Alafi a Senior Fellow of the Yeshiva University Center for Israel Studies.

== Productions ==
- “An Uman Travelogue” – The pilgrimage to the gravesite of Reb Nachman in Uman, Ukraine, Keshet Broadcasts, 30 min., 1996. Director: Noam Demsky.
- “My Sister Benchia” – A documentary film about an adopted Ethiopian girl. Hareshut Hashnia, 30 min., 1997. Director: Avigail Shperber.
- “Zorach – Refugee and Holocaust Survivor” – Filmed in: Israel, Germany, Poland, Lithuania, Belarus, China, Japan and the USA, Channel 1, 60 min., 1998. Director: Adir Zik.
- “Yam Suf” – Documentary film showing the human side of the destruction of the Gulf of Aqaba. The New Fund, Channel 8, The Israeli Film Channel. 30 min., 2000. Director: Nurit Jacobs Yinon.
- “One of 36” – A docu-drama about the “Father of Prisoners”, Rabbi Aryeh Levin. Channel One, Keren Avihai, Gesher Fund, 60 min. Screened in the U.S., France, and the Netherlands, supported by the Ministries of Defence and Education, The Film Fund, 2000.
- “Loose Connection” – A theater production which raises questions about the sense of belongingness of Israeli youth to the Jewish People, The Jewish Agency, 50 productions in Israel in 2002.

{having the entire plot of the play in your list of works here does not make sense, i recommend sticking with the same format for all entries on this list}.

- “When Dudu Met Aryeh” – A documentary about Dudu Topaz and Aryeh Deri's journey to Uman on Rosh Hashanah. 2003. Keshet Broadcasts, 55 min. Director: Yoram Zak.
- “Mr. Cohen and Mister Cohen” – Community collaboration film series between Israel and the U.S. for the Israeli Government Advertising Agency and the Jewish Agency. Three puppet dramas, Animation, 12 min. each.
- “Arise From the Dust” – Story of the lives of the special community members of Homesh in Samaria, until their expulsion in 2005. 60 min, Channel 10. Languages: Hebrew and English. Director: Menora Hazani.
- “Two Legacies” – A family saga of the Kapach family and the Yemenite community, 60 min.
- “Greenhouse” – The story of Ronit Belavan facing the collapse of her house alone during the disengagement from Gush Katif, 2009, Reshet Broadcasts. Languages: Hebrew and English.
- “Knights of the Night in the Old City” – Middle Ages Festival, October 2010, Christian Quarter of Jerusalem's Old City.
- “The Heroes Return” – Hanukkah Family Theater Festival – Beit Avichai, Jerusalem. December 2010.
- “A Moment Before the Show” – Hospital Drama. December 2010, 30 min. Director: Omri Levi. Script: Prof. Ariel Ravel and Nitza Aviram.
- “The Heroes Return” – Hanukkah Family Festival, 2011–2013, Beit Avichai and the Bible Lands Museum.
- “The Brave Hearts” – Hanukkah Family Festival, Rishon Letsiyon Museum, 2013.
- “Ways of Life” – 56-episode studio series – business, law, and medicine – Meir Channel, 2013 – Hot.
- “Cool Communities” – 7-part docuseries, 30 min. Channel 1, 2012.
- “A Positive Outlook – Ofra” – A documentary about the women of Rahat. Channel 1, 30 min. 2014.
- “Smoothing Things Over”, Drama. Haifa Film Festival and Warsaw Film Festival, 2014, 30 min. Screenplay and Direction: Prof. Ariel Ravel.
- “All's Fair” – Satirical Israeli TV show based on “Laatma” (Israeli website). Editor-in-chief: Caroline B. Glick. Channel 1. 1 Season, 12 episodes. 2015.
- “Za’atar and Barkoka Protect the Environment” – Arabic drama web series – Season 2, 2017.
- "Restoring General Allenby's Gateway to Jerusalem", 2017–2018.
- “Tzelinka” – Theatre production. The story of an Auschwitz survivor – 2018.
- “The Four Elements” – Israel Antiquities Authority series about the four elements and passages from the Bible.

== Direction and production ==
- Musical at the Cinerama: “The Sound of Music” (1994); “The Amulet” (1995), “The Vision” (1997).

Film Awards Ceremony, Maaleh School for Film and Television, Binyanei Hauma, 1996–1999.

- “In Good Hands” – Docudrama for the Kehilat Yerushalayim Chevra Kadisha, 1999.
- “Israeli Communications Awards” Ceremony – Channel 1, Jerusalem Theater, 2000, 2001, 2003.
- “The Love of Theresa Dimon” – Original music, dance and theater performance based on the lyrics of Leah Goldberg, 2002. Directed with Karni Eldad.
- “Naf – A Street Kid” – Documentary film about Jerusalem's ‘street kids’. Second Authority for Television & Radio, 84 min., 2006. Translated to English and French. Participated in festivals in Jerusalem, Italy, Germany, Prague and China, with hundreds of screenings in Israel and worldwide. .
- “Alone on the Walls” – Documentary film – the story of the fighters of the Jewish Quarter in 1948. Channel 1, 2007
- “Cornerstone Laying of the Hurva Synagogue” – Old City, Jerusalem – 2001
- “Voice and Melody in the Shtetl” – A musical combining liturgical singing, video, choir and acting – In commemoration of the ten year anniversary Shem Olam, featuring cantors Tzadok Greenwald, Yaakov Motzen, Moshe Schulhof, and the Tel Aviv Cantorial Institute choir. Conducted by Naftali Hershtik, Tel Aviv Hall of Culture, 2008. Budapest, 2009.
- “Youth Cultural Leadership” – Mifal Hapais – 2009.
- “The Dream of Hunger” – A play of visions and cantors, Netanya, Tel Aviv, 2009. Producer: Levi Kans
- “Herzog” – Promotional film for Herzog College, September 2010.
- “Nes Ziona: A City with the Heart of a Colony” – A film reviewing Yossi Shevo's sixteen years as the Mayor of Nes Ziona, 2010.
- “Tourist Information Center” – A series of Jerusalem tourism films for the Tourist Information Center at Jaffa Gate, 2011.

Eighty Year Jubilee of the ‘Ezra’ youth movement with Avraham Fried.

- “From the Ends of the Earth, I Shall Call Unto Thee” – Documentary film about the journey of Breslav Hasidim to Uman – 50 min, 1994.
- “Between the Halls” – Opera and liturgical concert at the Tel Aviv Opera House, January 2011.
- “Gala Evening” celebrating 20 years of the Bible Lands Museum – videography, videos and staging of the event, 2012.*
- “On Forgiveness” A film for IDF soldiers with Yehoram Gaon, July 2013.
- "Gala Evening" celebrating 10 years of the Leket Israel organization, 2014, Airport City.
- "Questions of Life and Death" – Documentary film about a journey to Poland with Israel cultural figures – 2015. 60 min. In collaboration with Shem Olam. The film documents the journey of 17 prominent figures in the arts, law and society to Poland, to reencounter traumatic memories. Yehoram Gaon, Yona Elian, Professor Yaron Zelekha, Efrat Gosh and others grapple with questions about the past, present and future – to remember, and never forget.
- "The Brotherhood" – Promotional film in Hebrew and English – Barefoot encounters – 2016–2017.
- “Zaatar and Barkoka Protect the Environment” – Arabic drama web series – 2016–2017
- “The Story of the Land of Israel's Ancient Glass” – Israel Antiquities Authority, 2016.
- “The Land of Israel's Ancient Coins” – Displayed at the Museum of the bible in Washington, DC. Israel Antiquities Authority, 2016.
- “50 Years, 50 Faces” – Series of short films honoring 50 years since the reunification of the city, displayed as a video exhibit at the Tower of David Museum. Produced with support from the Jerusalem Development Authority and the Jerusalem Foundation, 2017.
- “The Blessing of the Mountain” – Presentation for Mt. Gerizim – Israel Nature and Parks Authority, 2018.
- "It's Not My Song" – a film for the first Israeli Democratic Congress in Israel, 2018.
- "The Sanhedrin Trail" – film series about the Sanhedrin Trail in the Galilee for the Israel Antiquities Authority – 2018–2019.
- “The Burnt House” presentation – multi-screen presentation in Jerusalem's Old City telling the story of the nation's destruction through the story of the Katrus family in 70 AD.
- “The Samaritans: Saving a Biblical People” – Feature documentary about the Samaritan tribe (The New Fund for Cinema and TV; Yeshiva University New York).
- “The International Bible Contest” – Israel Antiquities Authority and the International Bible Contest; Contests during 2019.
- “A New Jew in an Old Land” – Theodor Herzl's journey to Israel in 1898 – Presented by Uriel Feinerman. Produced for the 38th Zionist Congress of the World Zionist Organization. Languages: Hebrew, English, French, Russian, Spanish.

== Awards ==
2013 B'nai B'rith Award for Journalism for ‘Cool Communities’, broadcast on Channel 1. Documentary Film Prize at the Sole E Luna festival for “Naf – A Street Kid”.
