= Leonard Schleifer =

American businessman (born 1953)

Leonard S. Schleifer
- Born: 1953 (age 72–73)
- Education: Cornell University (BS); University of Virginia (MD, PhD)
- Occupations: Doctor; Businessman
- Known for: Founder and CEO of Regeneron Pharmaceuticals
- Spouse: Harriet Partel Schleifer
- Children: Adam Schleifer; David Schleifer
- Parent(s): Florence Schacht Schleifer; Charles Baker Schleifer

Leonard S. Schleifer (born 1953) is an American businessman and is the co-founder and chief executive of the biotechnology company Regeneron Pharmaceuticals.

== Early life and education ==
He was born and raised in a Jewish family, the son of Florence and Charles Baker Schleifer, in Queens, New York. His father was a sweater manufacturer and World War II codebreaker. He graduated with a B.S. from Cornell University and a MD-PhD from the University of Virginia where he studied under future Nobel Laureate, Alfred G. Gilman. He then worked at New York Hospital where he trained to become a neurologist and also served as a junior faculty member.

== Career ==
Noticing that the biotechnology company Genentech was conducting state-of-the-art research but not on diseases of the nervous system, Schleifer was determined to get into the biotechnology business. Choosing not to accept Gilman's efforts to recruit him as an academic, he found a sponsor in George Sing, a venture capitalist at Merrill Lynch, and obtained $1 million in seed capital. He also recruited George Yancopoulos, a 28-year-old scientist, to be his partner, and in 1988 they founded Regeneron Pharmaceuticals. After several years of trying to recruit research doctors many of whom preferred to work in academia or for large corporations, they developed their first drug to treat Lou Gehrig’s disease. It was a failure as was their second drug to treat obesity. Thereafter, they invited the former Merck & Co. CEO Roy Vagelos to be the chairman of their company and to help to turn the company around. He implemented two strategic changes; only invest in drugs in which the biology of the disorder is fully understood; and do not underestimate the importance of human testing to ensure that what works in the laboratory will also work in the real world.

=== Eylea ===
As CEO of Regeneron, Schleifer oversaw the "approval and growth of high-priced drugs." In 2011, Regeneron's first successful drug was Eylea for age-related macular degeneration. Eylea prevented leaky blood vessels in the eye from causing blindness. He licensed the drug to Aventis which was then bought by Sanofi which had no interest in the eye drug. Sanofi, in order to get out of its commitment, paid Regeneron $50 million and ceded the rights back to Regeneron. The drug was a blockbuster generating $838 million in its first full year and sales increased 55% to $1.3 billion in 2013 making Schleifer a billionaire. In 2014 Eylea grossed $1.735 billion.

As CEO Schleifer received a total compensation of $41,965,424 in 2014. According to the "annual collaborative report" from Equilar and The New York Times, Schleifer ranked 15th in the May 2015 list of "200 highest-paid CEOs of large publicly traded companies." He ranked first in the list of biopharmaceutical executives with the highest total compensation.

=== COVID-19 drugs ===
The subject is currently working on a multi-center, double-blind, Phase 2/3 trial with the partnership Sanofi, to evaluate the antibody agent, Kevzara(TM) for hospitalized patients starting in March 2020, as well as, working on the development of a novel, multi-antibody cocktail to be used as both a prevention of SARS-CoV-2 and treatment for infected patients. Regeneron's apparent privileged access of its experimental Covid-19 therapeutic to Donald Trump and members of the Trump administration drew criticism over ethical concerns.

== Personal life ==
He is married to Harriet (née Partel) Schleifer; they have two children, Adam and David. Harriet has an undergraduate degree from Cornell University, two graduate degrees in education from the University of Virginia and a J.D. degree from St. John's University School of Law. She also serves as a member of the Board of Governors of American Jewish Committee and as president of her synagogue.

Schleifer has known U.S. President Donald Trump for some years, as he was a member of Trump's golf club in Westchester County, New York.

His son Adam was one of many candidates for the nomination in the 2020 Democratic Primary for New York's 17th congressional district.
