= George Yancopoulos =

American biomedical scientist (born 1959)

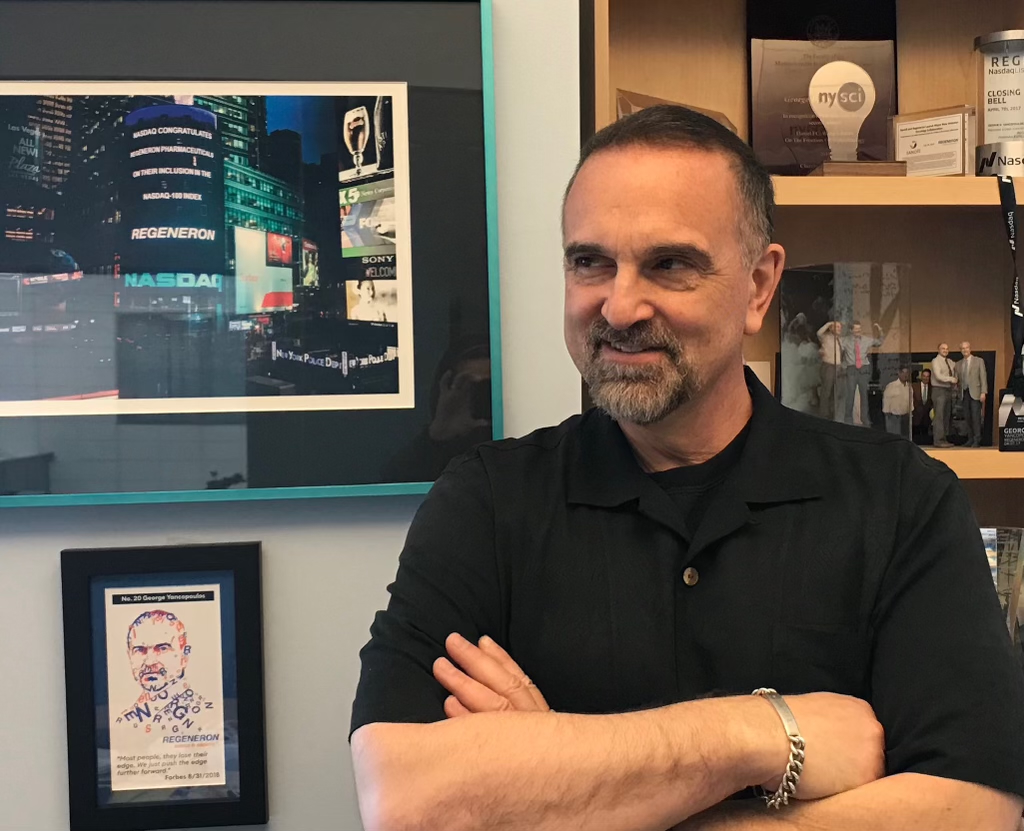
- Born: 1959 (age 66–67)
- Education: Columbia University (BA, MD, PhD)
- Occupation: Biomedical scientist
- Employer: Regeneron

George D. Yancopoulos (born 1959) is an American biomedical scientist who is the co-founder, president and chief scientific officer of Regeneron Pharmaceuticals.

Yancopoulos is an elected member of the National Academy of Sciences, a fellow of the American Academy of Arts and Sciences (AAAS), and the holder of more than 100 patents. He is a principal inventor and developer of Regeneron's ten FDA-approved or -authorized treatments, as well as of Regeneron's foundational technologies for target and drug development, such as its proprietary TRAP technology, and the VelociGene and VelocImmune antibody technologies.

== Early life and education ==
Yancopoulos was born in 1959 to parents who had immigrated to the United States from Greece. He spent his early childhood in Woodside, New York. When Yancopoulos was 13, his grandmother was affected with dementia and he wanted to find a cure. As an advanced science student at Bronx High School of Science, he started experimenting to regenerate neurons destroyed by diseases. His later experiments won him ninth place in the 1976 Westinghouse Science Talent Search. Intel and then Regeneron later assumed the title sponsorship for this Science Talent Search.

After graduating as valedictorian of both the Bronx High School of Science and Columbia College, Yancopoulos received his MD and PhD degrees in 1987 from Columbia University's College of Physicians & Surgeons. He then worked in the field of molecular immunology at Columbia University with Dr. Fred Alt, for which he received the Lucille P. Markey Scholar Award.

== Scientific career ==
He was elected to both the National Academy of Sciences and the American Association for the Advancement of Science in 2004. According to a study by the Institute for Scientific Information, he was the eleventh most highly cited scientist in the world during the 1990s, and the only scientist from the biotechnology industry on the list.

Yancopoulos was a graduate student in Fred Alt's laboratory at Columbia University in the 1980s. Much of Yancopoulos and Alt's work in immunology, including common recombination, accessibility control of recombination and scanning or tracking of recombinant action, has been recently validated.

Yancopoulos joined Regeneron in its earliest days. Once there, he cloned novel families of growth factors, neurotrophic factors, ephrins/Ephs and angiopoietins, and elucidated the basis of how many receptors work. His work has included study of how nerves regenerate and how muscles connect to nerves.

For example, the very first paper from his work at Regeneron documented the cloning of NT3 (Neurotrophic factor 3), a neurotrophic factor in the Nerve growth factor family. His group also cloned receptors for neurotrophic factors, such as TrkB, the receptor for BDNF, and showed that they were sufficient to mediate signaling without the requirement of the Low affinity Nerve Growth Factor receptor (LNGFR).

Yancopoulos and his colleagues discovered a receptor tyrosine kinase which they named "MuSK" (Muscle Specific Kinase, or MuSK protein). They went on to show that MuSK is required for the formation of the neuromuscular junction, the key structure which allows motor neurons to induce skeletal muscle to contract. They next demonstrated that the ligand for MuSK is agrin, a protein secreted by the motor neuron to induce formation of the neuromuscular junction.

What was also noteworthy from this period was the cloning of the receptor for the ciliary neurotrophic factor CNTF. The understanding of this receptor induced Yancopoulos and his colleagues to use the receptor in a novel fashion, by making a secreted form so as to "trap" or inhibit the ligand's action. This documented the invention of the "receptor trap", a concept which was used importantly in making a trap to inhibit the action of VEGF (Vascular endothelial growth factor). The "VEGF Trap" was then used to design a medicine to treat Acute Macular Degeneration (AMD), a disease which causes blindness.

Yancopoulos was the first to propose making mouse models with genetically human immune systems ("Human mice"). This research led to Yancopoulos at Regeneron developing "the most valuable mouse ever made," bred to have immune systems that respond just as a human's would, so that it can be used for testing how the human body might react to various pharmaceuticals and other substances.

Several important human antibodies, which were then tested for their use as medicines, have come from these mice. For example, a "cocktail," or mixture of three distinct antibodies to the Ebola virus resulted in treatment for Ebola. More recently, Yancopolous and his colleagues developed a cocktail of antibodies, using the mouse with a human immune system, to block the SARS-CoV-2 virus in order to treat COVID-19.

== Career ==
Yancopoulos left academia in 1989 to become the founding scientist and chief scientific officer of Regeneron Pharmaceuticals with founder and chief executive officer Leonard Schleifer, M.D., Ph.D. In 2016, Yancopoulos was also named president of the company.

Yancopoulos plays an active role in Regeneron's STEM (Science, Technology, Engineering and Math) Education commitments, including the Regeneron Science Talent Search, America's oldest high school science and math competition.

In 2014, Yancopoulos led the launch of the Regeneron Genetics Center, a major initiative in human genetic research that has sequenced exomes from over 1,000,000 people as of February 2020.

Forbes magazine states Yancopoulos's financial stake in Regeneron has made him a billionaire. He is the first research and development chief in the pharmaceutical industry to become a billionaire.

In 2026, the Wall Street Journal noted that Yancopoulos has 1000 patents, and is building Regeneron through internal science and discovery, not acquisitions.

== Awards ==
Yancopoulos won a NY/NJ CEO Lifetime Achievement Award in 2012.

Yancopoulos has been awarded Columbia University's Stevens Triennial Prize for Research and its University Medal of Excellence for Distinguished Achievement.

In 2016, Leonard Schleifer and George Yancopoulos were named the Ernst & Young Entrepreneurs of the Year 2016 National Award Winners in life sciences.

The George D. Yancopoulos Young Scientist Award is given at the Westchester Science & Engineering Fair.

He was inducted into the Bronx Science Hall of Fame in 2017 and was recognized by the Yale School of Management, CEO Institute as a Legends in Leadership Award in 2017.

In 2019, he received the Alexander Hamilton Award, Columbia's highest honor for contributions to science and medicine, and was recognized by Forbes as one of America's 100 Most Innovative Leaders.

Yancopoulos was recognized by Fortune in 2020 as one of the World's 25 Greatest Leaders: Heroes of the Pandemic.

In 2021, Yancopoulos won the Roy Vagelos Humanitarian Award for REGEN-COV, Prix Galien Foundation and the New York Intellectual Property Law Association's Inventors of the Year for REGEN-COV.

== Boards ==
Yancopoulos serves on a number of Boards, including on Regeneron's Board of Directors. He currently serves on the Columbia University Medical Center Board of Visitors, as Vice Chair starting in 2012; the Board of Trustees for Cold Spring Harbor Laboratory, since 2015; the Scientific Advisory Council, Alliance on Cancer Gene Therapy, since 2007; the Scleroderma Research Foundation, Scientific Advisory Board, starting in 2004; and the Pershing Square Cancer Research Alliance, Advisory Board, since 2018.

== Key Papers ==
- Yancopoulos GD, Alt FW (February 1985). "Developmentally controlled and tissue-specific expression of unrearranged VH gene segments". Cell. 40 (2): 271–81. doi:10.1016/0092-8674(85)90141-2. PMID 2578321. S2CID 41868099.
- Yancopoulos GD, Blackwell TK, Suh H, Hood L, Alt FW (January 1986). "Introduced T cell receptor variable region gene segments recombine in pre-B cells: evidence that B and T cells use a common recombinase". Cell. 44 (2): 251–9. doi:10.1016/0092-8674(86)90759-2. PMID 3484682. S2CID 35030279.
- Maisonpierre PC, Belluscio L, Squinto S, et al. (March 1990). "Neurotrophin-3: a neurotrophic factor related to NGF and BDNF". Science. 247 (4949 Pt 1): 1446–51. Bibcode:1990Sci...247.1446M. doi:10.1126/science.2321006. PMID 2321006. S2CID 37763746.
- Boulton TG, Nye SH, Robbins DJ, et al. (May 1991). "ERKs: a family of protein-serine/threonine kinases that are activated and tyrosine phosphorylated in response to insulin and NGF". Cell. 65 (4): 663–75. doi:10.1016/0092-8674(91)90098-J. PMID 2032290. S2CID 35051321.
- Glass DJ, Nye SH, Hantzopoulos P, et al. (July 1991). "TrkB mediates BDNF/NT-3-dependent survival and proliferation in fibroblasts lacking the low affinity NGF receptor". Cell. 66 (2): 405–13. doi:10.1016/0092-8674(91)90629-D. PMID 1649703. S2CID 43626580.
- Davis S, Aldrich TH, Valenzuela DM, et al. (July 1991). "The receptor for ciliary neurotrophic factor". Science. 253 (5015): 59–63. Bibcode:1991Sci...253...59D. doi:10.1126/science.1648265. PMID 1648265.
- Ip NY, Stitt TN, Tapley P, et al. (February 1993). "Similarities and differences in the way neurotrophins interact with the Trk receptors in neuronal and nonneuronal cells". Neuron. 10 (2): 137–49. doi:10.1016/0896-6273(93)90306-C. PMID 7679912. S2CID 46072027.
- Davis S, Gale NW, Aldrich TH, et al. (November 1994). "Ligands for EPH-related receptor tyrosine kinases that require membrane attachment or clustering for activity". Science. 266 (5186): 816–9. Bibcode:1994Sci...266..816D. doi:10.1126/science.7973638. PMID 7973638.
- DeChiara TM, Vejsada R, Poueymirou WT, et al. (October 1995). "Mice lacking the CNTF receptor, unlike mice lacking CNTF, exhibit profound motor neuron deficits at birth". Cell. 83 (2): 313–22. doi:10.1016/0092-8674(95)90172-8. PMID 7585948. S2CID 239940.
- Economides AN, Ravetch JV, Yancopoulos GD, Stahl N (November 1995). "Designer cytokines: targeting actions to cells of choice". Science. 270 (5240): 1351–3. Bibcode:1995Sci...270.1351E. doi:10.1126/science.270.5240.1351. PMID 7481821. S2CID 8882029.
- DeChiara TM, Bowen DC, Valenzuela DM, et al. (May 1996). "The receptor tyrosine kinase MuSK is required for neuromuscular junction formation in vivo". Cell. 85 (4): 501–12. doi:10.1016/S0092-8674(00)81251-9. PMID 8653786. S2CID 17455481.
- Glass DJ, Bowen DC, Stitt TN, et al. (May 1996). "Agrin acts via a MuSK receptor complex". Cell. 85 (4): 513–23. doi:10.1016/S0092-8674(00)81252-0. PMID 8653787. S2CID 14930468.
- Davis S, Aldrich TH, Jones PF, et al. (December 1996). "Isolation of angiopoietin-1, a ligand for the TIE2 receptor, by secretion-trap expression cloning". Cell. 87 (7): 1161–9. doi:10.1016/S0092-8674(00)81812-7. PMID 8980223. S2CID 17197564.
- Shrivastava A, Radziejewski C, Campbell E, et al. (December 1997). "An orphan receptor tyrosine kinase family whose members serve as nonintegrin collagen receptors". Molecular Cell. 1 (1): 25–34. doi:10.1016/S1097-2765(00)80004-0. PMID 9659900.
- DeChiara TM, Kimble RB, Poueymirou WT, et al. (March 2000). "Ror2, encoding a receptor-like tyrosine kinase, is required for cartilage and growth plate development". Nature Genetics. 24 (3): 271–4. doi:10.1038/73488. PMID 10700181. S2CID 239184.
- Holash J, Davis S, Papadopoulos N, et al. (August 2002). "VEGF-Trap: a VEGF blocker with potent antitumor effects". Proceedings of the National Academy of Sciences of the United States of America. 99 (17): 11393–8. Bibcode:2002PNAS...9911393H. doi:10.1073/pnas.172398299. PMC 123267. PMID 12177445.
- Valenzuela DM, Murphy AJ, Frendewey D, et al. (June 2003). "High-throughput engineering of the mouse genome coupled with high-resolution expression analysis". Nature Biotechnology. 21 (6): 652–9. doi:10.1038/nbt822. PMID 12730667. S2CID 18962215.
- Economides AN, Carpenter LR, Rudge JS, et al. (January 2003). "Cytokine traps: multi-component, high-affinity blockers of cytokine action". Nature Medicine. 9 (1): 47–52. doi:10.1038/nm811. PMID 12483208. S2CID 6541399.
