= Genentech =

American biotechnology corporation

Genentech, Inc.
- Type: Subsidiary
- Traded as: Nasdaq: DNA
- Industry: Biotechnology
- Founded: 1976; 50 years ago
- Founders: Robert A. Swanson; Herbert Boyer
- Headquarters: South San Francisco, California, United States
- Key people: Thomas Schinecker (Chairman); Ashley Magargee (CEO); Levi Garraway (CMO); Aviv Regev (EVP)
- Products: Avastin, Herceptin, Rituxan, Perjeta, Kadcyla, Gazyva, Tarceva, Ocrevus, Polivy, Tecentriq, Xofluza, Hemlibra, Venclexta, Esbriet, Cotellic, Alecensa, Zelboraf, Nutropin, Actemra, Lucentis, Xolair, Activase, Cathflo Activase, Xeloda, Boniva, TNKase, CellCept, Pegasys, Pulmozyme, Tamiflu, Valcyte, Anaprox, Cytovene, EC-Naprosyn, Erivedge, Fuzeon, Invirase, Klonopin, Kytril, Naprosyn, Rocephin, Roferon-A, Romazicon, Valium, Xenical, Zenapax
- Revenue: ▲$26.4 billion (2020)
- Number of employees: 12,100 (2026)
- Parent: Roche
- Website: www.gene.com

Genentech, Inc. is an American biotechnology corporation headquartered in South San Francisco, California. It operates as an independent subsidiary of holding company Roche. Genentech Research and Early Development operates as an independent center within Roche. Historically, the company is regarded as the world's first biotechnology company.

As of 2026, Genentech employs around 12,100 people.

== History ==
The company was founded in 1976 by venture capitalist Robert A. Swanson and biochemist Herbert Boyer. Boyer is considered to be a pioneer in the field of recombinant DNA technology. In 1973, Boyer and his colleague Stanley Norman Cohen demonstrated that restriction enzymes could be used as "scissors" to cut DNA fragments of interest from one source, to be ligated into a similarly cut plasmid vector. While Cohen returned to the laboratory in academia, Swanson contacted Boyer to found the company. Boyer worked with Arthur Riggs and Keiichi Itakura from the Beckman Research Institute, and the group became the first to successfully express a human gene in bacteria when they produced the hormone somatostatin in 1977. David Goeddel and Dennis Kleid were then added to the group, and contributed to its success with synthetic human insulin in 1978.

In 1982, Genentech agreed to sell a 6.5 percent equity stake to Corning Glass Works under which the companies created a jointly owned venture called Genencor to develop industrial enzymes using recombinant DNA technology.

In 1990 F. Hoffmann-La Roche AG acquired a majority stake in Genentech.

In 2006 Genentech acquired Tanox in its first acquisition deal. Tanox had started developing Xolair and development was completed in collaboration with Novartis and Genentech; the acquisition allowed Genentech to keep more of the revenue.

In March 2009, Roche fully acquired Genentech and made it a wholly owned subsidiary by buying all remaining shares it did not already control for approximately $46.8 billion.

In July 2014, Genentech acquired Seragon for its pipeline of small-molecule cancer drug candidates for $725 million cash upfront, with an additional $1 billion of payments dependent on successful development of products in Seragon's pipeline.

=== Acquisition history ===
- Hoffmann-La Roche (Founded 1896 by Fritz Hoffmann-La Roche)
  - Genentech, Inc. (Acq 2009)
    - Tanox, Inc (Acq 2006)
    - Arrayit Corporation (Acq 2013)
    - Seragon Pharmaceuticals, Inc. (Acq 2014)
    - Jecure Therapeutics (Acq 2018)

== Research ==
Genentech is a pioneering research-driven biotechnology company that has continued to conduct R&D internally as well as through collaborations.

Genentech's research collaborations include:

- In 2008 Genentech entered into a collaboration with Roche and its subsidiary GlycArt to develop obinutuzumab.
- In February 2010 Genentech entered into a collaboration with University of California, San Francisco after having worked with them in about fifteen other collaborations, this time to collaborate on small molecule drug discovery in neurology.
- In October 2014 Genentech paid $150M upfront to collaborate with Iowa-based NewLink Genetics on checkpoint inhibitors.
- In June 2015 it entered into a wide-ranging partnership with The Data Incubator to help train and hire the next generation of data scientists at the company.
- In January 2015 it signed a $60M deal with 23andMe that gave Genentech access to the genomic and patient-reported data held by 23andMe.
- In October 2015 it started a collaboration with Nimbus Therapeutics to develop leads from Nimbus' in silico drug discovery platform.
- In June 2016 Genentech partnered Epizyme to conduct clinical trials exploring whether Epizyme's EZH2 inhibitor tazemetostat would be synergistic with Genentech's atezolizumab.
- In August 2016, the company began a collaboration with Carmot Therapeutics in which Carmot will discover new candidates and Genentech will develop them.
- In September 2016 Genentech partnered with the Israeli company BioLineRx on a checkpoint inhibitor that Genentech intended to pair with its own atezolizumab.

== Facilities ==
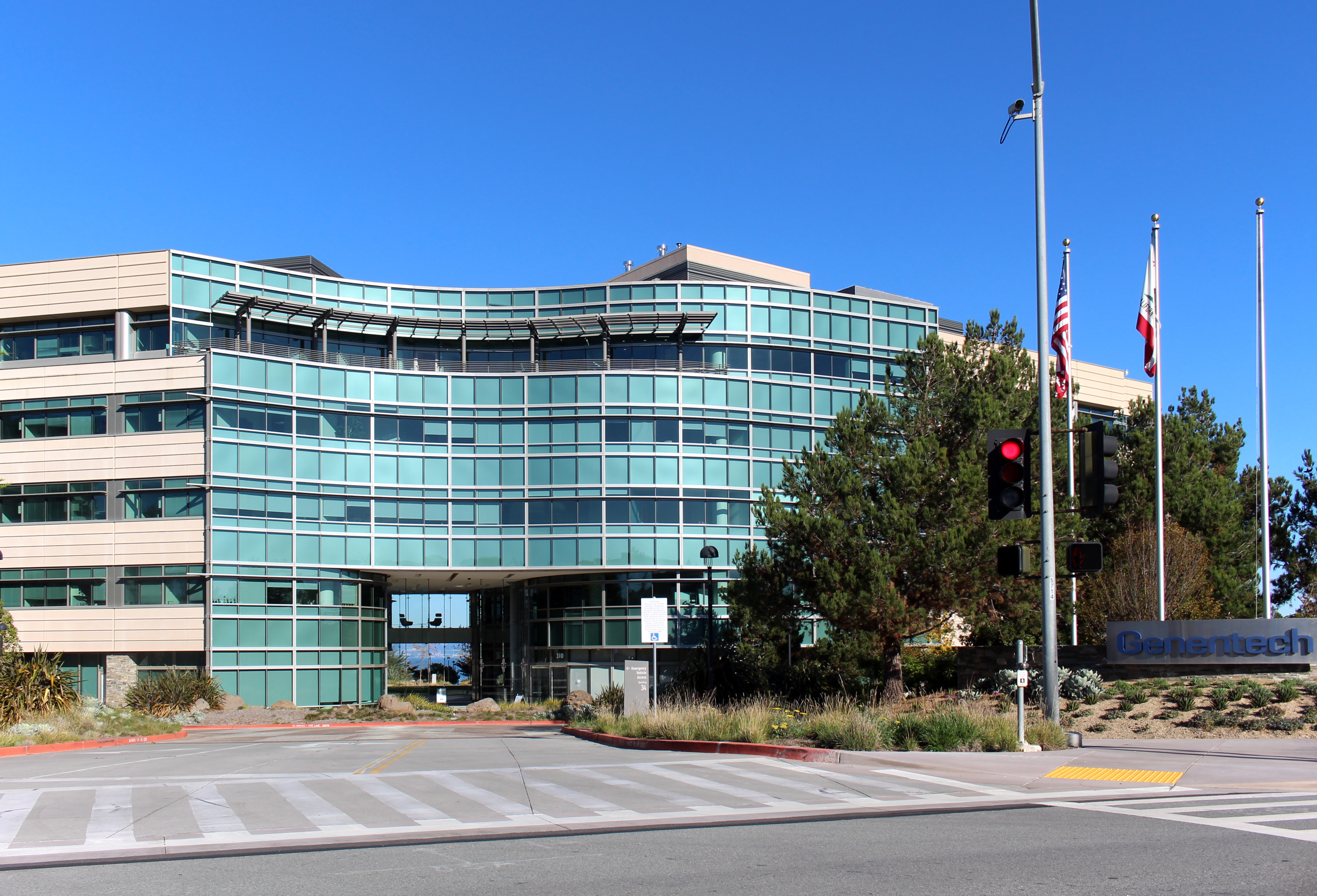
Building 31, one of the newer buildings at Genentech headquarters

Genentech's corporate headquarters are in South San Francisco, California (37.657°N 122.379°W), with additional manufacturing facilities in Oceanside, California and Hillsboro, Oregon.

In December 2006, Genentech sold its Porriño, Spain, facility to Lonza and acquired an exclusive right to purchase Lonza's mammalian cell culture manufacturing facility under construction in Singapore. In June 2007, Genentech began the construction and development of an E. coli manufacturing facility, also in Singapore, for the worldwide production of Lucentis (ranibizumab injection) bulk drug substance.

In 2023, the company announced plans to close down its manufacturing facility in South San Francisco, while expanding its manufacturing capabilities in Oceanside.

In March 2024, it was announced the Swiss pharmaceutical company, Lonza had acquired the Vacaville site from parent-company, Roche for $1.2 billion. On October 1, 2024, Lonza announced that the sale had been finalized.

== Public-private engagement ==
=== Political lobbying ===
Genentech is a donor to the Center for Health Care Strategies, a non-governmental organization that lobbies the United States Government on issues related to Medicaid.

==== Genentech Inc Political Action Committee ====
Genentech Inc Political Action Committee is a U.S. Federal Political Action Committee (PAC), created to "aggregate contributions from members or employees and their families to donate to candidates for federal office".

== Controversy ==
=== Disputes ===
In November 1999, Genentech agreed to pay the University of California, San Francisco $200 million to settle a nine-year-old patent dispute. In 1990, UCSF sued Genentech for $400 million in compensation for alleged theft of technology developed at the university and covered by a 1982 patent. Genentech claimed that they developed Protropin (recombinant somatotropin/human growth hormone), independently of UCSF. A jury ruled that the university's patent was valid in July 1999, but wasn't able to decide whether Protropin was based upon UCSF research or not. Protropin, a drug used to treat dwarfism, was Genentech's first marketed drug and its $2 billion in sales has contributed greatly to its position as an industry leader. The settlement was to be divided as follows: $30 million to the University of California General Fund, $85 million to the three inventors and two collaborating scientists, $50 million towards a new teaching and research campus for UCSF, and $35 million to support university-wide research.

In 2009, The New York Times reported that Genentech's talking points on health care reform appeared verbatim in the official statements of several Members of Congress during the national health care reform debate. Two U.S. Representatives, Joe Wilson and Blaine Luetkemeyer, both issued the same written statements: "One of the reasons I have long supported the U.S. biotechnology industry is that it is a homegrown success story that has been an engine of job creation in this country. Unfortunately, many of the largest companies that would seek to enter the biosimilar market have made their money by outsourcing their research to foreign countries like India." The statement was originally drafted by lobbyists for Genentech.

== Products timeline ==
- 1982: Synthetic "human" insulin approved by the U.S. Food and Drug Administration (FDA), partnered with insulin manufacturer Eli Lilly and Company, who shepherded the product through the FDA approval process. The product (Humulin) was licensed to and manufactured by Lilly, and was the first-ever approved genetically engineered human therapeutic.
- 1985: Protropin (somatrem): Supplementary growth hormone for children with growth hormone deficiency (ceased manufacturing 2004).
- 1987: Activase (alteplase): A recombinant tissue plasminogen activator (tPa) used to dissolve blood clots in patients with acute myocardial infarction. Also used to treat non-hemorrhagic stroke.
- 1990: Actimmune (interferon gamma 1b): Treatment of chronic granulomatous disease (licensed to Intermune).
- 1993: Nutropin (recombinant somatropin): Growth hormone for children and adults for treatment before kidney transplant due to chronic kidney disease.
- 1993: Pulmozyme (dornase alfa): Inhalation treatment for children and young adults with cystic fibrosis—recombinant DNAse.
- 1997: Rituxan (rituximab): Treatment for specific kinds of non-Hodgkin's lymphomas. In 2006, also approved for rheumatoid arthritis.
- 1998: Herceptin (trastuzumab): Treatment for metastatic breast cancer patients with tumors that overexpress the HER2 gene. Recently approved for adjuvant therapy for breast cancer. FDA also recently approved Trastuzumab for metastatic gastric cancer with HER2 receptor site positive.
- 2000: TNKase (tenecteplase): "Clot-busting" drug to treat acute myocardial infarction.
- 2003: Xolair (omalizumab): Subcutaneous injection for moderate to severe persistent asthma.
- 2003: Raptiva (efalizumab): Antibody designed to block the activation and reactivation of T cells that lead to the development of psoriasis. Developed in partnership with XOMA. In 2009, voluntary U.S. market withdrawal after reports of progressive multifocal leukoencephalopathy.
- 2004: Avastin (bevacizumab): Anti-VEGF monoclonal antibody for the treatment of metastatic cancer of the colon or rectum. In 2006, also approved for locally advanced, recurrent or metastatic non-small cell lung cancer. In 2008, accelerated approval was granted for Avastin in combination with chemotherapy for previously untreated advanced HER2-negative breast cancer. In 2009, Avastin gained its fifth approval for treatment of glioblastoma multiforme, and sixth approval for the treatment of metastatic renal cell carcinoma. It was most publicized for its approval in advanced breast cancer treatment, but the FDA approval for breast cancer treatment was subsequently revoked in November 2011.
- 2004: Tarceva (erlotinib): Treatment for patients with locally advanced or metastatic non-small cell lung cancer, and pancreatic cancer.
- 2006: Lucentis (ranibizumab injection): Treatment of neovascular (wet) age-related macular degeneration (AMD). The FDA approved LUCENTIS after a Priority Review (six-month). Genentech started shipping product on June 30, 2006, the day the product was approved.
- 2010: Actemra (tocilizumab): The first interleukin-6 (IL-6) receptor-inhibiting monoclonal antibody approved to treat rheumatoid arthritis.
- 2011: Zelboraf (vemurafenib): For the treatment of metastatic melanoma caused by BRAF mutation.
- 2012: Erivedge (vismodegib): Treatment for advanced basal-cell carcinoma (BCC). A small molecule inhibitor that targets a key protein in the Hedgehog signaling pathway. This is the first approved therapy for advanced BCC.
- 2012: Perjeta (pertuzumab): For use in combination with Herceptin (trastuzumab) and docetaxel chemotherapy for the treatment of patients with previously untreated HER2-positive metastatic breast cancer.
- 2013: Kadcyla (ado-trastuzumab emtansine): The first Genentech antibody-drug conjugate (ADC) to receive FDA approval. It consists of trastuzumab (Herceptin) linked to a cytotoxic agent mertansine (DM1), used in the treatment of HER2-positive metastatic breast cancer.
- 2013: Gazyva (obinutuzumab): For use in combination with chlorambucil to treat patients with previously untreated chronic lymphocytic leukemia (CLL). Gazyva is the first drug with breakthrough therapy designation to receive FDA approval.
- 2014: Esbriet (pirfenidone): An anti-fibrotic drug for the treatment of idiopathic pulmonary fibrosis (IPF). Developed by Intermune, Inc.
- 2015: Cotellic (cobimetinib): For use in combination with ZELBORAF (vemurafenib), to treat metastatic melanoma caused by BRAF mutation.
- 2015: Alecensa (alectinib): Treatment for non-small cell lung cancer (NSCLC).
- 2016: Venclexta (venetoclax): Treatment for patients with chronic lymphocytic leukemia (CLL) who have a chromosomal abnormality called 17p deletion and who have been treated with at least one prior therapy.
- 2016: Tecentriq (atezolizumab): First-in-class anti-PD-L1 antibody for the treatment of advanced bladder cancer or metastatic non-small cell lung cancer (NSCLC), both after failure of platinum-based chemotherapy. Tecentriq was granted accelerated approval for its advanced bladder cancer indication due to promising phase II results.
- 2017: Ocrevus (ocrelizumab): The first FDA-approved therapy that treats both relapsing-remitting multiple sclerosis (RRMS) and primary progressive multiple sclerosis (PPMS). The PPMS form of the disease previously had no approved treatments.
- 2017: Hemlibra (emicizumab): Treatment for haemophilia A. Developed by Chugai Pharmaceutical Co.
- 2018: Xofluza (Baloxavir marboxil): Antiviral medication for treatment of influenza A and influenza B. Developed by Shionogi.
- 2019: Polivy (Polatuzumab vedotin-piiq): Treatment of diffuse large B-cell lymphoma when used in combination with bendamustine and rituximab.

== See also ==
- Evan Morris (lobbyist)
