= Marc Rosenberg (screenwriter) =

American screenwriter and film producer

- Born: Houston, Texas
- Education: University of Texas at Austin
- Occupations: Screenwriter and producer
- Writing career
- Genres: Thriller, drama

Marc Rosenberg is an American screenwriter and producer with professional roots in Australia. He has taught screenwriting and film production in the U.S., India, Norway, China and Australia. Rosenberg has contributed to "Film International Magazine" and written a screenwriting guide, "The Screenplay Tree: Story Structure Made Easy."

Rosenberg is currently a Senior Teaching Fellow at Bond University and has written his debut novel, "Kyd's Game", a fast-paced, contemporary, espionage thriller set mostly in Russia. "Kyd's Game" was released September 24, 2024.

== Early life ==
He was raised in Houston, Texas, and graduated from the University of Texas at Austin with a degree in Government. Following graduation, he hitchhiked through Europe and Asia, settling for a brief time in London, where he worked as an estate agent. He later spent a year living on kibbutz in Israel, and then moved to Sydney, New South Wales, where he was accepted into the Writers-in-Residence program at the prestigious Australian Film Television and Radio School. There, he studied with fellow students Jane Campion, Alex Proyas, P.J. Hogan and Andrew Lesnie.

== Career ==
After graduating, Rosenberg was invited by acclaimed director Phillip Noyce to collaborate on the screenplay Heatwave, which starred Judy Davis. Rosenberg went on to write screenplays for such feature films as Dingo (starring Miles Davis), The Nesting (aka The Serpent's Lair), Incident at Raven's Gate, Australie (starring Jeremy Irons) and December Boys (starring Daniel Radcliffe). Rosenberg was nominated for an Australian Film Institute (AFI) Best Picture award for Dingo, for which he also received a prestigious AWGIE award from the Australian Writers' Guild, as well as the New South Wales State Literary Award. He also received an AWGIE for Best Feature Film Adaptation in 2007 for December Boys.

Rosenberg finished shooting the suspense-thriller Elevator, which he wrote and produced. The film, which is about people trapped in a New York elevator with a terrorist, features actors John Getz, Shirley Knight, Joey Slotnick, Devin Ratray, Waleed Zuaiter, Anita Briem, Tehmina Sunny, Christopher Backus, Michael Mercurio, Amanda Pace and Rachel Pace. It is Rosenberg's second film to be shot in the U.S. It was released in 2011.

== Filmography ==
- Heatwave (1982) (writer)
- Encounter at Raven's Gate (1988) (co-writer/producer)
- Australie (1989) (co-writer)
- Dingo (1991)(writer/producer)
- Serpent's Lair (1995) (writer/associate producer)
- December Boys (2007) (writer)
- Elevator (2011) (writer/producer)
