= Evan Morris =

Evan Morris may refer to:

- Evan Morris (lobbyist) (1977–2015), American lawyer and lobbyist
- Evan Morris (writer) (1949–2017), American writer and columnist
