= Lisa Barbuscia =

American model, singer and actress

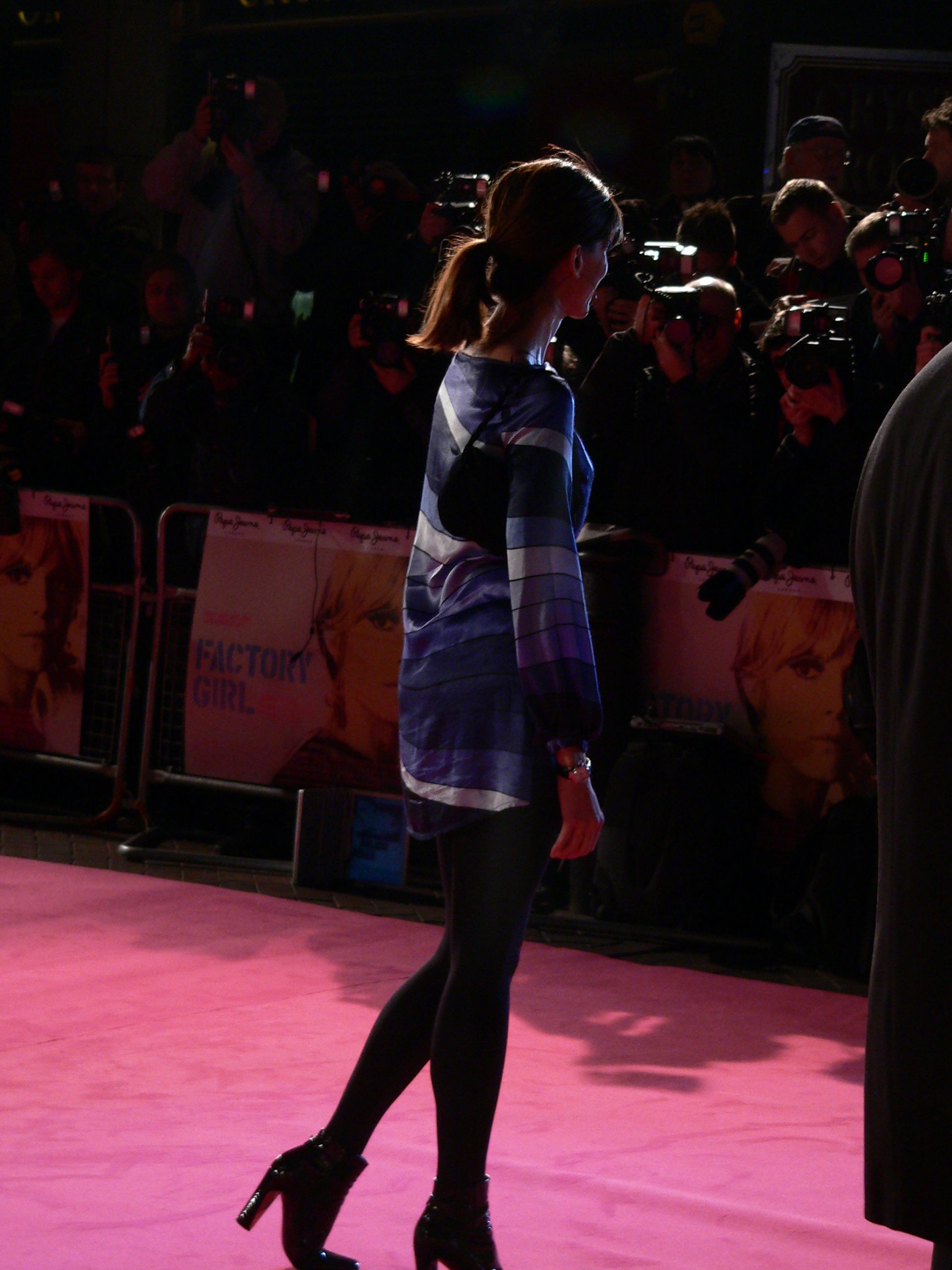
- Lisa B. at the London premiere of Factory Girl in 2007
- Born: June 18, 1969 (age 57); Brooklyn, New York, United States
- Occupations: Film actress, model, singer
- Years active: 1995–2010
- Spouse: Anton Bilton

Lisa Barbuscia (born June 18, 1969), also known as Lisa B, is an American model, singer and actress. She is known for small roles in a number of films, including Bridget Jones's Diary, Highlander: Endgame, and Almost Heroes.

== Music career ==
She released her debut EP Telling Tales in 2004, and sang the song Adore You for the 2001 film Kiss of the Dragon.

At 19 she signed a recording contract with Pete Tong at London Records, and recorded with the producer, Paul Oakenfold. She released three singles, "Glam", "Fascinated" and "You & Me", all of which reached the UK Singles Chart.

== Personal life ==
Barbuscia is married to UK-based property developer Anton Bilton, a founder of Raven Property Group. They have three sons, Orlando, Noah, and Gabriel, and homes in London and at Tyringham Hall in Buckinghamshire.

She participated in the PETA's campaign "Leave Wildlife out of Your Wardrobe".

== Filmography ==
| Year | Title | Role | Notes |
|---|---|---|---|
| 1995 | Serpent's Lair | Lillith | |
| 1998 | Almost Heroes | Shaquinna | |
| 2000 | Highlander: Endgame | Kate MacLeod / Faith | |
| 2001 | Bridget Jones's Diary | Lara | |
| 2003 | Michel Vaillant | Ruth Wong | |
| 2006 | Rabbit Fever | Nicky | |
