= John Getz =

American actor

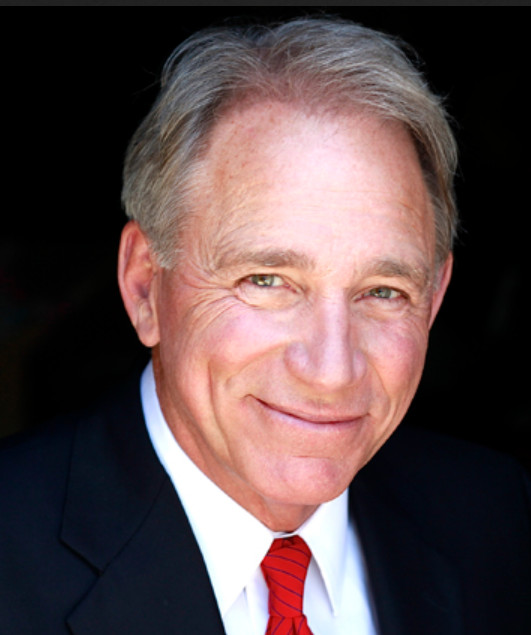
- Getz in 2018
- Born: October 15, 1946 (age 80); Davenport, Iowa, U.S.
- Occupation: Actor
- Years active: 1970–present
- Spouse: Grace McKeaney (m. 1987; div. 1996)
- Children: 1

John Getz (born October 15, 1946) is an American character actor. After starting his acting career on stage, he has appeared in numerous television series and films, most notably Blood Simple, The Fly, The Social Network, and Better Call Saul.

== Early life ==
Getz, one of four children, was born in Davenport, Iowa, and grew up in the Mississippi River Valley. He is the son of William and Kay Getz. His father operated a heavy-machine company, and his mother's family worked in construction.

He was raised in Moline, Illinois, and attended Moline High School, where he was a member of the swimming team. As a student at the University of Puget Sound, he participated in theater to avoid being on the university's swimming team. He attended the University of Iowa intending to participate in its Writers Workshop. He planned to write and teach, but involvement with the university's theater department turned his interest to acting.

== Career ==
Immediately after his college experience Getz began working with the American Conservatory Theater. He performed for a year with a touring company, after which he was one the founders of a theater company in Napa Valley. After moving to New York he performed in plays in East Village and was an understudy for productions in Lincoln Center's Shakespeare Festival.

Getz appeared in The Happy Hooker (1975) and followed up with several other roles before starring in the Coen brothers' neo-noir thriller Blood Simple (1984). He played the doomed lover of a married woman (Frances McDormand) who woefully misinterprets his increasingly complex circumstances.

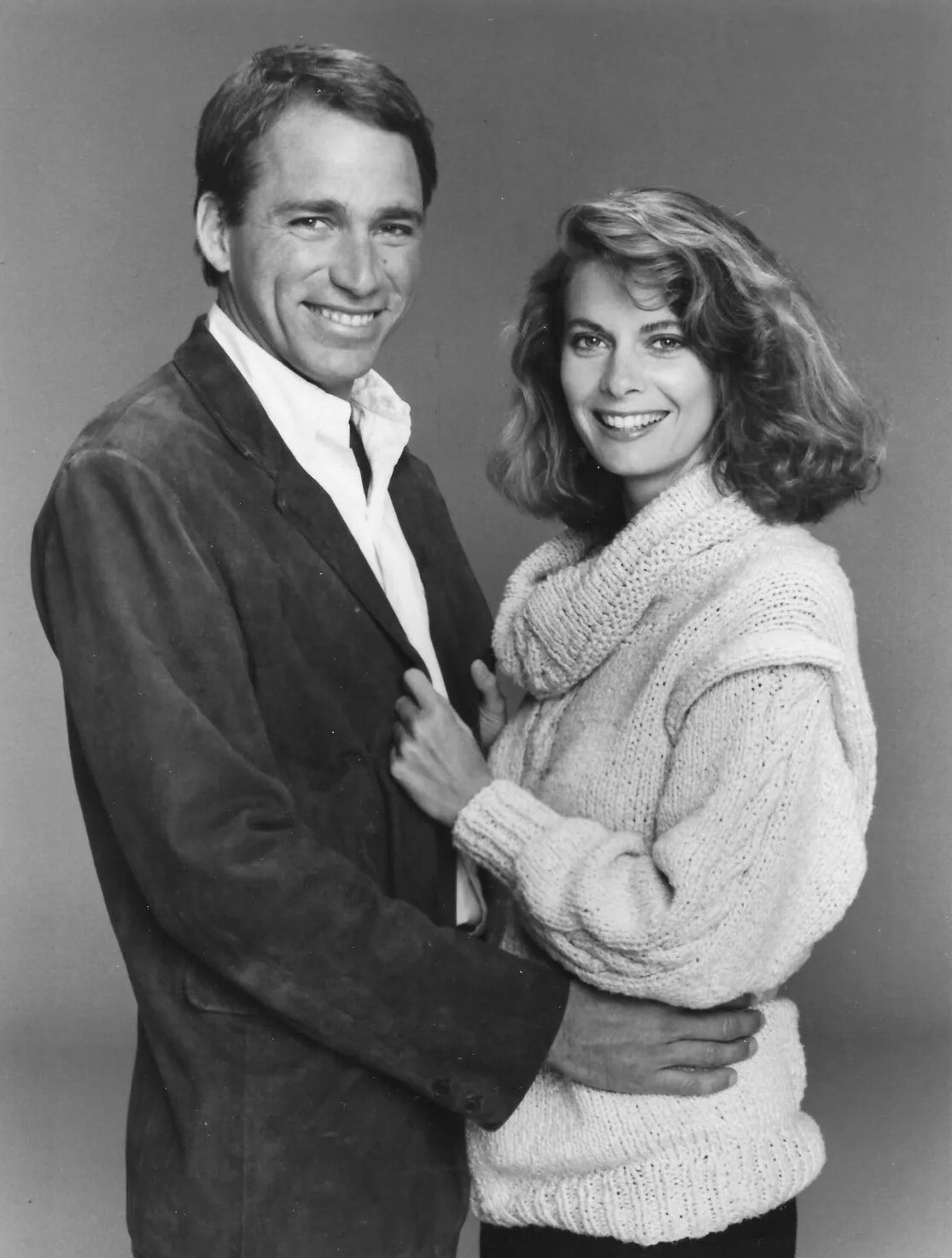
Getz with Kathryn Harrold, MacGruder and Loud

In 1985, he co-starred in the police drama MacGruder and Loud. The pilot aired after Super Bowl XIX on January 20, 1985, and the series subsequently aired on ABC. The series was canceled by ABC after its first season.

Getz appeared in two television series with Maggie in their titles: Suzanne Pleshette Is Maggie Briggs (1984), in which he played Geoff Bennett, the new editor of the New York Examiner, and Maggie (1998–1999), in which he played Dr. Arthur Day, the title character's husband.

Getz also appeared in The Fly (1986) and The Fly II (1989) as Stathis Borans, a science magazine editor who pays a heavy price for his curiosity.

Also in 1989, he appeared in Born on the Fourth of July as a Marine major. In 1990, he played a greedy tycoon in the Charlie Sheen and Emilio Estevez spoof Men at Work. In 1991, he appeared as Gus in Don't Tell Mom the Babysitter's Dead and as an obnoxious corporate lawyer boyfriend in Curly Sue. In 1994, he appeared in the film Playmaker, starring Colin Firth and Jennifer Rubin.

In 2007, he had a role in David Fincher's film Zodiac. Also in 2007, he appeared in Bill Guttentag and Dan Sturman's documentary film Nanking as George Ashmore Fitch, head of the local YMCA and administrative director of the International Committee for the Nanking Safety Zone. Getz also had a role in Fincher's film The Social Network (2010), about the founding of Facebook. He appeared in the suspense thriller Elevator as a Wall Street executive trapped in an elevator with a group of strangers, one of whom has a bomb. Written and produced by Marc Rosenberg and directed by Stig Svendsen, Elevator was released in July 2012. He appeared in Trumbo (2015) as director Sam Wood.

Through the decades, Getz has guest-starred in many television series, including Barney Miller (in the 1977 episode "Atomic Bomb") and Three's Company (1980), where he played Lee Tripper, brother of Jack Tripper. He has guest-starred in How I Met Your Mother, Prison Break, The King of Queens and Private Practice, and had recurring roles in Homeland (2014–2017), Timeless (2016–2018), Bosch (2017–2018), and the Netflix series A Man on the Inside (2024).

== Personal life ==
Getz married playwright Grace McKeaney on January 3, 1987; They have a daughter together.

== Filmography ==
=== Film ===
Year	Title	Role	Notes
1975	The Happy Hooker	Trout Fisherman	
1981	Tattoo	Buddy	
1984	Blood Simple	Ray	
1984	Thief of Hearts	Ray Davis	
1986	The Fly	Stathis Borans	
1989	The Fly II	Stathis Borans	
1989	Born on the Fourth of July	Marine Major - Vietnam	
1990	Men at Work	Maxwell Potterdam III	
1991	Don't Tell Mom the Babysitter's Dead	Gus	
1991	Curly Sue	Walker McCormick	
1994	Fortunes of War	Franklin Hewitt	
1994	Playmaker	Eddie	
1994	A Passion to Kill	Jerry	
1996	Mojave Moon	Police Officer	
1998	Some Girl	Claire's Father	
2000	Held for Ransom	Mr. Kirkland	
2004	A Day Without a Mexican	Senator Abercombie	
2007	Nanking	George Fitch	Documentary
2007	Zodiac	Templeton Peck	
2008	Superhero Movie	Lunatic Editor	
2010	The Social Network	Sy	
2011	Elevator	Henry Barton	
2013	Jobs	Paul Jobs	
2015	The Perfect Guy	Renkin	
2015	Trumbo	Sam Wood	
2016	Certain Women	Sheriff Rowles	
2018	Brampton's Own	Bart	
2019	Body at Brighton Rock	Sheriff	
2023	The Dead Don't Hurt	Reverend Simpson	

=== Television ===
Year	Title	Role	Notes
1974	Killer Bees	Attendant	Television film
1974–1976	Another World	Neil Johnson	Main role, 122 episodes
1977	The Andros Targets	Dan Bridger	1 episode
1977	On Our Own	Tom Ericson	1 episode
1977	Rafferty	Dr. Daniel Gentry	Main role, 13 episodes
1977	The New Adventures of Wonder Woman	Christian Harrison	1 episode
1977	Barney Miller	William McKuen	1 episode
1978	Barnaby Jones	Walter Alberts	1 episode
1978	Loose Change	John Campbell	Miniseries
1978	A Woman Called Moses	Stewart	Miniseries, 2 episodes
1978–1981	Ryan's Hope	Jim / Dr. Morgan Thomas	2 episodes
1979	The Associates	William Simmons	1 episode
1980	Three's Company	Lee Tripper	1 episode
1982	Muggable Mary, Street Cop	Dan Waters	Television film
1984	Maggie Briggs	Geoff Bennett	5 episodes
1985	ABC Afterschool Special	Thomas Sanders	1 episode
1985	The Lucie Arnaz Show	Scott Harris	1 episode
1985	MacGruder and Loud	Malcolm MacGruder	Main role, 15 episodes
1989	Roseanne	John Hale	1 episode
1990	Murphy Brown	Bob Wiltz	1 episode
1993	Triumph Over Disaster: The Hurricane Andrew Story	Doug Hulin	Television film
1993	Crossroads	Greg	1 episode
1993	Phenom	Jack	1 episode
1995	The 5 Mrs. Buchanans	Roy Buchanan	2 episodes
1995–1996	Murder, She Wrote	Kyle Kimball / Jonas Cole	2 episodes
1995–1996	Ned and Stacey	Les MacDowall	Recurring role, 6 episodes
1996	The Late Shift	Brandon Tartikoff	Television film
1996	A Friend's Betrayal	Dennis Hewitt	Television film
1996	Mr. & Mrs. Smith	Karl Hansen	1 episode
1998–1999	Maggie	Dr. Arthur Day	Main role, 20 episodes
1999	JAG	Admiral Harrison Spencer	1 episode
2000	Providence	Dr. Sullivan	1 episode
2000; 2014	CSI: Crime Scene Investigation	Richard Zeigler / Bill Harvey	2 episodes
2001	Zenon: The Zequel	General Hammond	Television film
2001	The Guardian	Wendell Rapke	1 episode
2003	CSI: Miami	George Risher	1 episode
2003	According to Jim	Frank	1 episode
2003	Joan of Arcadia	D.A. Gabe Fellowes	Recurring role, 6 episodes
2004	Without a Trace	Mr. Garrett	1 episode
2004–2006	The King of Queens	Mr. Dugan	3 episodes
2005	Mystery Woman	Dan	1 episode
2005	Wanted	Mr. Salinger	1 episode
2005	Medium	Councilman Stuart McCallister	1 episode
2006	Cold Case	Bill Simmons	1 episode
2006	Close to Home	Maurice Hardecker	1 episode
2006	The West Wing	Congressman Mark B. Sellner	2 episodes
2006	Las Vegas	Freddie Smith	1 episode
2006–2007	Day Break	Judge Tobias Booth	Recurring role, 5 episodes
2007	Shark	Judge Nicholas	1 episode
2007	Big Shots	Walter Storrs	1 episode
2008	How I Met Your Mother	Bob Hewitt	Episode: "Miracles"
2008	Swingtown	Steve Gilboy	1 episode
2008	Mad Men	Dr. Eric Stone	1 episode
2008	Grey's Anatomy	Michael Breyers	2 episodes
2008	Eleventh Hour	William Gregory	1 episode
2008	Prison Break	Dr. Roger Knowlton	1 episode
2009	Trust Me	Peter Derby	2 episodes
2009	Criminal Minds	Andrew Kane	1 episode
2009	Private Practice	Mr. Kent	1 episode
2010	Ghost Whisperer	Rudy Wharton	1 episode
2010	NCIS	Walter Kane	1 episode
2012	Scandal	Patrick Keating	1 episode
2012	Touch	Henry Williams	1 episode
2013	Law & Order: Special Victims Unit	Admiral Vincent Albers	1 episode
2013	Eagleheart	Bernard Moss	1 episode
2013	NCIS: Los Angeles	Senator Lockhart	1 episode
2013	Nikita	Senator Ed Chappell	2 episodes
2014	Bones	Steven Frank	1 episode
2014	Castle	Dr. Gustavo Bauer	1 episode
2014	Bad Teacher	Howard	1 episode
2014	Halt and Catch Fire	Joe MacMillan Sr.	2 episodes
2014	How to Get Away with Murder	David Dolan	1 episode
2014–2017	Homeland	Joe Crocker	4 episodes
2016	Criminal Minds: Beyond Borders	Randal Cowan	1 episode
2016	NCIS: New Orleans	Army General Owen Matthews	1 episode
2016	Aquarius	James Harrison Barret	4 episodes
2016–2017	Grace and Frankie	John	3 episodes
2016–2017	Transparent	Donald	4 episodes
2016–2018	Timeless	Benjamin Cahill	Recurring role, 9 episodes
2017	Better Call Saul	Chairman	2 episodes
2017	Ghosted	Director Romsio	1 episode
2017–2018	Bosch	Bradley Walker	Recurring role, 13 episodes
2018	American Horror Story: Apocalypse	Mr. St. Pierre Vanderbilt	2 episodes
2018–2020	Dirty John	Dwight / Doug Layton	Recurring role, 5 episodes
2020–2021	Doom Patrol	Paul Trainor	4 episodes
2022–2023	Alaska Daily	Conrad Pritchard	4 episodes
2023	The Last of Us	Edelstein	2 episodes
2023	Fatal Attraction	Warren	Miniseries, 4 episodes
2023	Reservation Dogs	James Minor	1 episode
2024–present	A Man on the Inside	Elliot Haverhill	Recurring role, 9 episodes
2026	The Pitt	Lloyd Wilkins	3 episodes
