= Michael Mercurio =

American actor (born 1982)

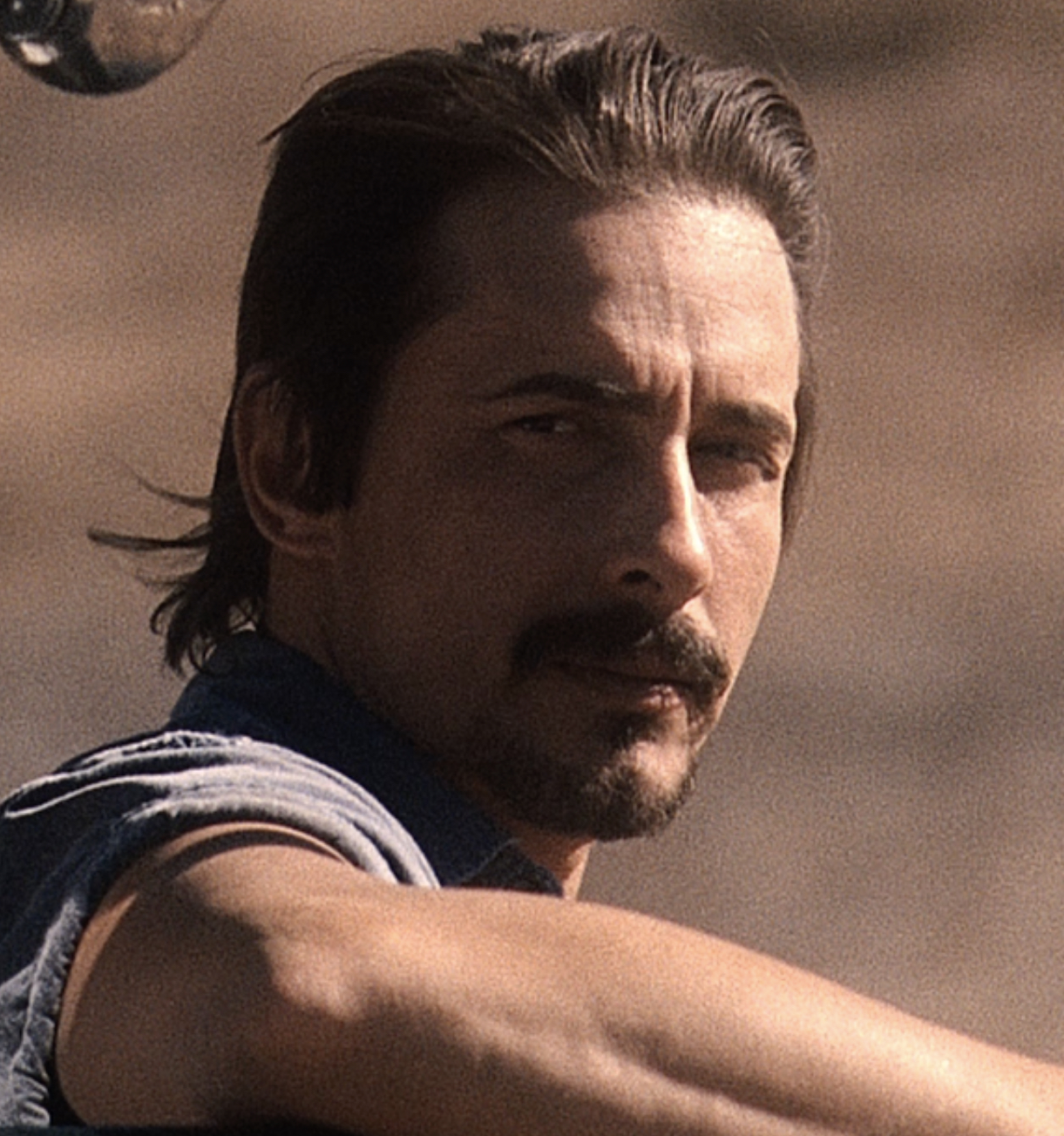
- Michael Mercurio
- Born: January 8, 1982 (age 44); Columbus, Ohio, U.S.
- Education: Ridgewood High School
- Occupation: Actor
- Years active: 2004–present
- Notable work: Elevator directed by Stig Svendsen
- Parents: Rick Frank (father); Kathy Wollard (mother)

Michael Mercurio (born January 8, 1982) is an American actor who has appeared in film, theatre, and television, often portraying idiosyncratic characters.

Mercurio was born in Columbus, Ohio. His family moved to Brooklyn, New York when he was 5 years old. When he was a teenager, they relocated to Ridgewood, New Jersey, where Mercurio attended Ridgewood High School. During that period, his primary interest was art, but that changed in his early 20s, when he moved to Chicago to study acting. He completed an acting conservatory and was offered a scholarship with the Chicago Actor's Studio.

While living in Chicago, Mercurio made his off-Broadway theatre debut with StageLeft Theatre in Jorge Aviles' Nicas, playing the lead role as a gay man who returns to Nicaragua to confront his past. Mercurio received excellent reviews, and shortly thereafter was offered his first film role in the low-budget Angel in Chains (2004), in which he portrayed an outlaw biker.

In 2004, he moved to Los Angeles, where he accepted roles in a string of independent and short films, to broaden his acting range in an effort to avoid being typecast. He played a compulsive gambler, in the independent movie Fixing Rhonda (2008). Other movie projects followed, including God Complex (2009), in which he played a computer programmer who questions his ethical obligations, and other films such as Psycho Killer Reflections on God, Adoration, Jarhead and Brainstorm.

In 2010, Mercurio played a disenchanted former soldier who has been recruited to build a bomb for a domestic terrorist, in the independent suspense-thriller Elevator, written and produced by Marc Rosenberg (Dingo, December Boys) and directed by Stig Svendsen (The Radio Pirates). Elevator was released in January 2012.

In addition to his screen work, Mercurio is a former member of The Actors' Gang theatre in Los Angeles, which was founded by acclaimed actor Tim Robbins. He is also an artist known for his unusual blend of sculpture and canvas, utilizing surrealistic dark themes.

Mercurio’s biological father Rick Frank (1942 - 1998) was best known as co-founder and drummer of the band Elephant's Memory, which performed with various artists, including John Lennon and Yoko Ono under the name Plastic Ono Elephant's Memory Band. Mercurio’s mother, Kathy Wollard, is the author of the popular How Come? syndicated newspaper column and Web site. His stepfather, Evan Morris, was an author and syndicated newspaper columnist, best known for the column The Word Detective.

== Filmography ==
Year	Film	Role	Other notes
1999	Summer of Sam	Protester	
2003	Tio's Game	Anthony	
2004	Angel in Chains	Pete	
2005	Jarhead	Marine	
2008	Fixing Rhonda	Greaser	
2008	My Happiness	Tony Davies	
2009	God Complex	Linden	
2009	Brainstorm (TV series)	Ryan	
2010	Adoration	Nicholas	
2010	Anti-Samaritan Hotline	John Curtis	
2012	Elevator	Bombmaker	
2015	The Unraveling	Aaron	
