= Thomas Schinecker =

Austrian-German Chief Executive Officer Roche Group

Thomas Schinecker Dr
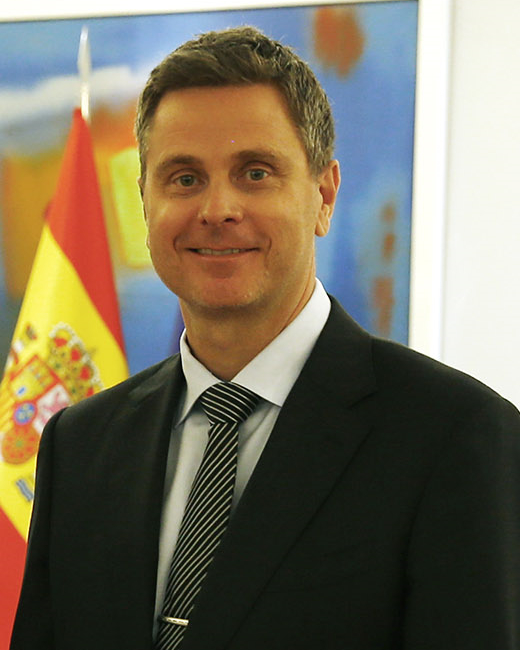
- Born: April 23, 1975 (age 51); Simbach am Inn, West Germany.
- Citizenship: Austrian, German
- Education: University of Salzburg; New York University
- Occupation: CEO of Roche
- Children: 3

Thomas Schinecker (born April 23, 1975 in Simbach am Inn) is an Austrian-German pharmaceutical executive and the chief executive officer of the Roche Group since March 2023. He succeeded Severin Schwan, who was elected chairman of the board of directors of the Roche Group.

== Early life ==
Schinecker was born to an Austrian father and German mother in Simbach am Inn, West Germany. From the age of nine, he grew up in Singapore as the son of an ABB employee, and attended the German school. At the age of 19, he began studying genetics at the University of Salzburg, graduating with a bachelor's degree in 1997. He then continued his studies as a molecular biologist at New York University where he received his M.S in 2000 and Ph.D. in 2003.

== Career ==
In 2003, Schinecker joined the Roche Group as a management trainee working in the Roche diagnostics division in several countries.

In 2005, he transitioned to the diagnostics field and assumed the position of Head of Marketing and Sales for Roche Diagnostics in Austria. Subsequently, he held the role of General Manager for Roche Diagnostics in Sweden, followed by a two-year tenure in the United States. Later, he became the General Manager of Roche Diagnostics in Germany. He was appointed CEO Roche Diagnostics in Rotkreuz, Switzerland in 2019. Schinecker is known for leading the company's COVID-19 test kit efforts as the CEO of the Roche Diagnostics division.

In January 2023, he served ad-interim as CEO Roche Pharmaceuticals before taking on the position of CEO full-time in March 2023, succeeding Severin Schwan.

== Memberships ==
Schinecker is a member of the Innovation Board of Labor Berlin (Charité and Vivantes).

Since 2022, Schinecker serves as Vice-President of IFPMA. In November 2024, IFPMA announced that Schinecker would replace Albert Bourla as President. In 2025, he was appointed President of the International Federation of Pharmaceutical Manufacturers and Associations (IFPMA) and serves as Chair of the Biopharmaceutical CEOs Roundtable (BCR). He also serves as a member of the Innovation Board of Labor Berlin (Charité and Vivantes) and was elected to the Board of Directors of Chugai Pharmaceutical in Japan in 2025.

== Personal life ==
Schinecker holds both Austrian and German citizenship. Schinecker is married and has three children. The family has lived near Rotkreuz, Switzerland, since 2017. He plays basketball, volleyball and squash.
