= The Single Guy =

American sitcom television series

- Genre: Sitcom
- Created by: Brad Hall
- Starring: Jonathan Silverman; Joey Slotnick; Ming-Na Wen; Ernest Borgnine; Mark Moses; Jessica Hecht; Shawn Michael Howard; Olivia d'Abo
- Music by: Ed Alton
- Country of origin: United States
- Original language: English
- No. of seasons: 2
- No. of episodes: 44 (1 unaired)

Production
- Executive producers: Brad Hall; Erwin More; Jonathan Silverman; Michael Davidoff; Bill Rosenthal; Sam Weisman
- Producer: Richard Doctorow
- Camera setup: Multi-camera
- Running time: 30 minutes
- Production companies: Hall of Production (1995–1996) (season 1); NBC Productions (1995–1996) (season 1); NBC Studios (1996–1997) (season 2); Castle Rock Entertainment; Columbia TriStar Television

Original release
- Network: NBC
- Release: September 21, 1995 – April 14, 1997

The Single Guy is an American sitcom television series that ran for two seasons on NBC, from September 21, 1995, to April 14, 1997. It starred Jonathan Silverman as struggling New York City writer Jonathan Eliot and followed several of his close friends (some of whom came and left as the show was re-tooled between seasons). The series also starred Joey Slotnick as Eliot's best friend Sam Sloan, Ming-Na Wen as Sam's wife Trudy and Ernest Borgnine as doorman Manny, throughout its entire run. The Single Guy was created by Brad Hall.

== Cast ==
=== Main ===
- Jonathan Silverman as Jonathan Eliot
- Joey Slotnick as Sam Sloan
- Ming-Na Wen as Trudy Sloan
- Ernest Borgnine as Manny Cordoba
- Mark Moses as Matt Parker (season 1)
- Jessica Hecht as Janeane Percy-Parker (season 1)
- Shawn Michael Howard as Russell (season 2)
- Olivia d'Abo as Delilah (pilot episode of season 1), and Marie Blake (season 2)

=== Recurring ===
- Michael Winters as Mike (season 1)
- Jensen Daggett as Charlie McCarthy (season 2)
- Dan Cortese as Dan Montgomery (season 2)
- Mariska Hargitay as Kate Conklin (season 2)
- Suzanne Pleshette as Sarah Eliot (season 2)

=== Notable guest stars ===
- Larry Miller as cable guy ("Pilot")
- David Schwimmer as Ross Geller ("Neighbors")
- Julia Louis-Dreyfus as Tina ("Mugging")
- Megan Ward as Monica ("Gift")
- Illeana Douglas as Martha ("Sister", "Distance")
- Jack Black as Randy ("Sister")
- Willie Garson as Ted ("Communication")
- Conan O'Brien as Cameron Duncan ("Rival")
- Kevin Tighe as Jack Blake ("Rival")
- George Plimpton as himself ("Rival")
- Jimmy Breslin as himself ("Rival")
- Marie Osmond as herself ("Pudding")
- Renée Taylor as Zelda ("Pudding")
- Kevin Weisman as Lyle ("Pudding")
- Paula Abdul as herself ("Affair")
- Donal Logue as Billy ("Wedding", "Lovenest")
- Emilio Estevez as himself ("Wedding")
- Rodney Dangerfield as himself ("Kept Man")
- Maureen McCormick as Valerie ("Kept Man")
- Al Roker as Dr. Benjamin ("New Year")
- Wendie Malick as Dr. Cornick ("New Year")
- Jenna Elfman as Jordan ("Just Friends?")
- Molly Shannon as Melody Pugh ("Macho Men")
- Don Rickles as Dr. Dick Sloan ("Big Baby")
- Jonathan Lipnicki as Rudy ("Big Baby")
- Jason Alexander as himself ("Grandfather Clause")
- Ray Wilson as himself ("Grandfather Clause")
- Amy Yasbeck as herself ("Grandfather Clause")
- Paula Marshall as Isabella ("Grandfather Clause")
- Kristin Davis as Leslie ("Jonathan Hollywood")

== Episodes ==
=== Series overview ===
Season	Episodes	Originally released	
Season	Episodes	First released	Last released
1	22	September 21, 1995	May 16, 1996
2	21	September 19, 1996	April 16, 1997

=== Season 1 (1995–96) ===
No. overall	No. in series	Title	Directed by	Written by	Original release date	Prod. code	Viewers (millions)
1	1	"Pilot"	Sam Weisman	Brad Hall	September 21, 1995	100101	29.9
2	2	"Tennis"	Sam Weisman	Brad Hall	September 28, 1995	100102	26.3
3	3	"Gift"	Sam Weisman	Richard Doctorow	October 5, 1995	100104	27.7
4	4	"Babysitting"	Sam Weisman	John Masius	October 12, 1995	100106	23.5
5	5	"Charity"	Sam Weisman	Andrew Gottlieb & Jay Kogen & Steve Paymer	October 19, 1995	100103	23.9
6	6	"Neighbors"	Sam Weisman	David Kohan & Max Mutchnick	November 2, 1995	100105	27.1
7	7	"Mugging"	Sam Weisman	David Kohan & Max Mutchnick & Richard Doctorow	November 9, 1995	100107	28.2
8	8	"Sister"	Sam Weisman	David Kohan & Max Mutchnick	November 16, 1995	100108	27.9
9	9	"Attraction"	Sam Weisman	Jay Kogen	December 7, 1995	100109	23.6
10	10	"Midnight"	Sam Weisman	Jay Kogen	December 14, 1995	100110	25.5
11	11	"Communication"	Sam Weisman	Richard Doctorow	January 4, 1996	100112	27.3
12	12	"Nineteen"	Sam Weisman	Jim McCoulf	January 11, 1996	100113	23.2
13	13	"Distance"	Sam Weisman	Steve Paymer	January 18, 1996	100111	25.0
14	14	"Rival"	Sam Weisman	Richard Doctorow	February 1, 1996	100114	26.3
15	15	"Pudding"	Sam Weisman	David Kohan & Max Mutchnick	February 8, 1996	100115	24.9
16	16	"Affair"	Sam Weisman	Andrew Gottlieb	February 15, 1996	100116	25.1
17	17	"Wedding"	Sam Weisman	Brad Hall	February 22, 1996	100117	25.6
18	18	"Poetry"	Craig Zisk	Paul Barrosse	March 7, 1996	100118	24.4
19	19	"Lovenest"	Craig Zisk	Brad Hall & Richard Doctorow	March 14, 1996	100119	22.8
20	20	"Kids"	Craig Zisk	Andrew Gottlieb & John Masius	May 2, 1996	100122	22.4
21	21	"Pop"	Craig Zisk	Andrew Gottlieb	May 9, 1996	100120	22.9
22	22	"Moving"	David Trainer	Richard Doctorow & Jay Kogen	May 16, 1996	100121	24.5

=== Season 2 (1996–97) ===
No. overall	No. in series	Title	Directed by	Written by	Original release date	Prod. code	Viewers (millions)
23	1	"Mounted Cop"	Craig Zisk	Rachel Sweet	September 19, 1996	100203	24.47
24	2	"Best Man"	Craig Zisk	Gayle Abrams	September 26, 1996	100201	24.07
25	3	"Good God"	Craig Zisk	Michael Davidoff & Bill Rosenthal	October 3, 1996	100204	22.17
26	4	"Kept Man"	Craig Zisk	Gayle Abrams	October 10, 1996	100206	24.86
27	5	"Strip Club"	Craig Zisk	Andrew Gottlieb	October 17, 1996	100205	20.05
28	6	"Love Train"	Craig Zisk	Stephen Godchaux & Rachel Sweet	October 31, 1996	100207	21.81
29	7	"The Virgin"	Craig Zisk	Michael Davidoff & Bill Rosenthal	November 7, 1996	100208	24.58
30	8	"Double Date"	Max Tash	Richard Doctorow	November 14, 1996	100209	25.00
31	9	"Davy Jones"	Alan Myerson	Andrew Gottlieb	November 21, 1996	100210	26.06
32	10	"Deepest Cut"	Kim Friedman	Stephen Godchaux	December 12, 1996	100211	22.86
33	11	"New Year"	Craig Zisk	Michael Davidoff & Bill Rosenthal	January 9, 1997	100212	24.58
34	12	"Like Father..."	Max Tash	Stephen Godchaux & Rachel Sweet	January 16, 1997	100213	26.89
35	13	"Starting Over"	Craig Zisk	Story by : Andrew Gottlieb & John Masius; Teleplay by : John Masius	January 23, 1997	100214	22.15
36	14	"Just Friends?"	Pamela Fryman	Gayle Abrams	January 30, 1997	100215	24.40
37	15	"Macho Men"	Craig Zisk	Richard Doctorow	February 6, 1997	100216	25.20
38	16	"Mother Love"	Andrew Tsao	Suzanne Myers & Cody Farley	February 13, 1997	100217	23.59
39	17	"Big Baby"	Andrew Tsao	Rachel Sweet	February 20, 1997	100218	25.66
40	18	"Grandfather Clause"	Craig Zisk	Story by : Barbara Hobart; Teleplay by : Will Gluck	March 26, 1997	100219	8.74
41	19	"Jonathan Hollywood"	Linda Day	Rob Cornick & Cory Jachnuk	April 2, 1997	100220	8.74
42	20	"Au Pair"	Michael Zinberg	Peter Schneider & Ben Cardinale	April 9, 1997	100222	N/A
43	21	"Vegas Finale"	Gail Mancuso	Karen Russell	April 16, 1997	100221	7.71
44	22	"Pilot Redux"	Craig Zisk	Brad Hall	Unaired	100202	N/A

== Production and reception ==
While the series was favored enough by NBC to earn a timeslot in its coveted "Must-See-TV" Thursday night line-up, it ultimately failed to generate enthusiasm with critics and viewers. It was largely written-off as a clone of the network's other "singles in the city" sitcoms that emerged in the mid-1990s, following the success of Seinfeld and Friends. The Single Guy emulated many of the same traits and tropes of those series, from the neurotic best friend who occasionally does reprehensible things, to its main character's rotating cast of flawed girlfriends. Jonathan and friends would also regularly hang out at a local coffee shop, The Bagel Cafe, which was seen by some viewers as too similar to Friends, of which David Schwimmer guest starred as his character Ross Geller.

Although the series earned high ratings, consistently attaining 4th or 5th place in the Nielsen ratings, NBC was disappointed in the show's critical failure. For its second season, the series underwent retooling. As a result, cast members Jessica Hecht and Mark Moses were let go and replaced with Olivia d'Abo (who had appeared in the series' pilot episode as a completely different character) and Shawn Michael Howard. Dan Cortese and Jensen Daggett were also cast in heavily recurring roles. The retooling did not work, forcing NBC to pull the series and move it to a different night in the Spring of 1997. No longer airing in between Friends and Seinfeld, ratings plummeted upon its move, with nearly two-thirds of its audience gone. Perhaps aware of its impending cancellation, the series ended its second and final season with Jonathan Eliot married in Las Vegas, thus ending his single status.

Ernest Borgnine later recalled working on the show fondly, but expressed his displeasure with the retooling and felt that it – along with behind-the-scenes dysfunction – led to its cancellation.
