= Elevator (2011 film) =

- Film poster
- Directed by: Stig Svendsen
- Written by: Marc Rosenberg
- Produced by: Marc Rosenberg
- Starring: Christopher Backus; Anita Briem; John Getz; Shirley Knight; Rachel and Amanda Pace; Devin Ratray; Joey Slotnick; Tehmina Sunny; Waleed Zuaiter
- Cinematography: Alain Betrancourt
- Edited by: Thomas Løvig
- Music by: Herman Christoffersen; Bjørnar Johnsen
- Release dates: January 20, 2011 (Tromsø International Film Festival); July 11, 2012 (US)
- Running time: 84 minutes
- Country: United States
- Language: English

Elevator is a 2011 American mystery thriller film directed by Stig Svendsen. It follows the struggles and conflicts of nine strangers trapped in a Wall Street elevator 49 floors above Manhattan on the way to a company party. One member of the group has a bomb. The film's events follow the group's attempts to escape, with racism, greed and revenge playing key elements as they all fight to survive.

== Plot ==
Nine people board an elevator in a New York City skyscraper 52 stories tall: security guard Mohammed, television reporter Maureen and her fiance Don, comedian George, newly widowed Jane, overweight employee Martin, pregnant Celine, and the building owner Henry Barton with his spoiled ten-year-old granddaughter Madeline, who are on their way to a company party on the top floor.

On the way up, George, a claustrophobe, panics and, on the 49th floor, Madeline hits the emergency stop button to torment him. Henry presses the lobby floor button, but the elevator only descends by a few feet and stops. Henry presses the call button and alerts security. When the elevator fails to move, security dispatches a maintenance crew.

While waiting for help, the group talk with each other. Jane, who says that her son died in Iraq in the last year, confronts Henry and says her husband lost everything because Barton Investments pushed junk bonds. In her anger, she planned on "making a point" at the party. Suddenly, Jane collapses and dies of a heart attack, but before she dies, she admits that she has a bomb. After arguing, Celine checks Jane's body and finds the bomb secured around her waist by means of a bike lock. Don tries to look for a way out via the ceiling, to no avail.

Don stops Celine from smoking, and she asks when he became a concerned father. Maureen overhears and demands an explanation; Don confesses he is the father of Celine's unborn child. Maureen is distraught. Henry once again calls security, but he angers them and they stop responding. Maureen documents the events with her phone and sends them to her television station, which picks up the story and starts running the footage she has captured.

The others force open the doors, and Don attempts to climb out. The opening is too small, but he uses Jane's walking stick to press the elevator call button. At the same time, Madeline presses several buttons on the control panel. The elevator's brakes deactivate, and Don's arm is severed as the elevator drops several floors. Mohammed uses a necktie as a tourniquet to slow the blood loss. Henry is left confused and dazed. George suggests that they pry open the doors again to see if the elevator has lined up with a floor in their drop, but they discover that the elevator stopped between floors, much to their dismay. Martin brings up the local news on his phone, and they watch a live interview with the bomb maker. The man was good friends with Jane's son and felt that he owed their family. He estimates it will detonate in ten minutes.

Desperate, George suggests dismembering Jane's body to separate her from the bomb and throw it down the shaft. When he loses his nerve, an angry Henry takes over, with George making Henry promise each person $1 million should they survive. While they are trying to tear the bomb off, a security guard on the intercom tells them that the bomb squad is there and lowers the elevator. They open the doors, make a small opening, and help all but Martin escape. When only Martin is left, he knows that the opening is not big enough for him to fit through. George desperately orders the SWAT members to raise the elevator to rescue Martin. As they lower the elevator to the basement to get him out, Martin weeps, knowing his death is imminent. Before the bomb explodes, he regains his composure and realizes he is the hero, as he helped everybody survive.

Don is taken to the hospital, and George asks Henry about the $1 million he promised each of the group, which he ignores. George and Mohammed have a brief discussion outside the building about what lies ahead for them. A news reporter asks George how he stayed so brave during the ordeal, to which George lies and said he had to stay calm for everybody there, then races off after a phone call from his wife, who had no idea what happened, to pick something up from the store. Mohammed looks on.

== Cast ==
The film hosts an ensemble cast:

- Christopher Backus as Don Handley, a mutual funds manager at Barton, fiancé of Maureen
- Anita Briem as Celine Fouquet, a mutual funds employee at Barton who is pregnant.
- John Getz as Henry Barton, CEO of Barton Investments.
- Shirley Knight as Jane Redding, a newly widowed woman whose investments in Barton recently tanked.
- Rachel and Amanda Pace as Madeline Barton, Henry Barton's 10-year-old granddaughter.
- Devin Ratray as Martin Gossling, a mutual funds manager at Barton.
- Joey Slotnick as George Axelrod, a claustrophobic comedian who was booked at the last minute.
- Tehmina Sunny as Maureen Asana, an investigative reporter for a local news station, fiancée of Don.
- Waleed Zuaiter as Mohammed, a security guard.
- Michael Mercurio as The Bombmaker

== Release ==
Rumored for a 2011 release, there were sneak preview screenings at the Australian Film and Television School, the University of Southern California and the Los Angeles Film School. The film was released in the U.S. in August 2011.

== Reception ==
Steve Barton of Dread Central rated it 3.5/5 stars and wrote, "In the end it hits the mark way more than it misses and easily ranks up there with some of the year's best thrillers." Karin Crighton of HorrorTalk rated it 3/5 stars and wrote that the film did not live up to its potential.
