= Almost Heroes =

1998 American comedy Western film by Christopher Guest

- Theatrical release poster
- Directed by: Christopher Guest
- Written by: Mark Nutter; Tom Wolfe; Boyd Hale
- Produced by: Denise Di Novi
- Starring: Chris Farley; Matthew Perry; Eugene Levy; Kevin Dunn
- Cinematography: Adam Kimmel; Kenneth MacMillan
- Edited by: Ronald Roose
- Music by: Jeffrey C.J. Vanston
- Production companies: Turner Pictures; DiNovi Pictures
- Distributed by: Warner Bros.
- Release date: May 29, 1998
- Running time: 90 minutes
- Country: United States
- Language: English
- Budget: $30 million
- Box office: $6.1 million

Almost Heroes is a 1998 American adventure comedy Western film directed by Christopher Guest, narrated by Guest's friend and frequent collaborator Harry Shearer, and starring Chris Farley and Matthew Perry. The film marked Farley's last leading film role and was released posthumously, five months after his death in 1997. The film also marked Turner Pictures' final film after the company folded into Warner Bros. on November 14, 1996 (due to the Turner-Time Warner merger on October 10, 1996). Almost Heroes was produced by Turner Pictures and DiNovi Pictures and released by Warner Bros. on May 29, 1998. The film received negative reviews from critics and was a box office bomb, grossing $6.1 million against a $30 million budget.

== Plot ==
In 1804, Leslie Edwards, a foppish aristocrat, and the loud, low-brow Bartholomew Hunt are competing against the renowned Lewis & Clark to be the first to chart and make it across the United States to the Pacific Ocean. In the beginning of the film, Edwards has high hopes to head the first expedition to make it across the United States, but while he has ambition and funding, he has grown up sheltered and knows little of the wilderness he seeks to cross. To aid in his journey, he hires the services of a supposedly knowledgeable wilderness-man and tracker, Hunt, who, once they get underway, turns out to be less than advertised.

They are aided by a crew of varied, rugged and grizzled frontiersmen, including the group's version of Sacagawea, a young Indian woman by the name Shaquinna, who is integral in helping them find their way across the dangerous and unknown terrain ahead, as well as eventually becoming Edwards' love interest. Along the way, the group goes through various mishaps and ordeals such as having to deal with quirky, indigenous Indian tribes and vicious animals, a Conquistador named Hidalgo, as well as running out of food and romantic snafus, as Hunt's ineptness often causes more problems than it solves. Along the way, Edwards and Hunt's shared journey helps Edwards shed his aristocratic, snooty ways and he learns camaraderie and honor, as well as a more humble view of a world he thought he understood. Hunt finds true friendship in Edwards and a sense of self-confidence he had not known before.

After many hardships and setbacks, they eventually make it to the Pacific coast just minutes before Lewis and Clark's expedition; however, once the celebration is over, they find that they do not necessarily want to go back to their old lives and collectively decide to continue their adventure, leading Edwards and Hunt's expedition to further explore the great uncharted world.

== Cast ==
- Chris Farley as Bartholomew Hunt
- Matthew Perry as Leslie Edwards
- Eugene Levy as Guy Fontenot
- Kevin Dunn as Hidalgo
- Bokeem Woodbine as Jonah
- Lisa Barbuscia as Shaquinna
- David Packer as Bidwell
- Steven M. Porter as Higgins
- Hamilton Camp as Pratt
- Patrick Cranshaw as Jackson
- Christian Clemenson as Father Girard
- Frank Sotonoma Salsedo as Old Indian
- Franklin Cover as Nicholas Burr
- Jonathan Joss as Bent Twig
- George Aguilar as Chief Two Roads
- Lewis Arquette as Merchant
- Don Lake as Elias
- John Farley as Bartender
- Tim DeKay as New Bartender
- Brent Hinkley as Trapper
- David Barrera as Ferdinand
- Jay Lacopo as Hector
- Rusty Schwimmer as Execution Witness
- Harry Shearer as Narrator

== Production ==
=== Development ===
The script was written under the title Edwards & Hunt. The screenwriters' agent, Rob Carlson, also represented Steve Oedekerk, who was able to help the script circulate; it was ultimately purchased by Turner Pictures.

Chris Farley was the first actor to be cast. The writers originally wanted to offer the role of Leslie Edwards to Hugh Laurie; at that point, he was a star only in the United Kingdom, so Turner executives wished for a more recognizable actor. The role was turned down by Hugh Grant and Bill Murray before Matthew Perry accepted the part.

=== Filming ===
The film had a budget of US$30 million. Feeling that the humor of the story was in putting the goofball protagonists against a historical backdrop, the filmmakers opted for realism in the art design. Principal photography began in the summer of 1996. Four weeks were spent shooting in the Big Bear region of Northern California. A town representing St. Louis c. 1804 was constructed at Reading Island park on the Sacramento River, east of Cottonwood, California, and a Native American village set was built upriver. Heat posed a major challenge for the summer shoot, with actors wearing furs in temperatures of over one hundred degrees. For the sequences of the boat on the River, the 2nd unit crew traveled to West Central Montana to film scenic areas on the Missouri River, right along the Helena National Forest and Lewis and Clark National Forest. Additional scenes were shot on locations in Humboldt County, California.

Filming was completed in the fall of 1996, with a 1997 release target. However, the film was delayed a full year due to the pending merger between Turner and Time Warner. Farley died on December 18, 1997, of a drug overdose. By the time the film was released on May 29, 1998, Chris Farley had been dead nearly six months.

=== Post-production ===
Writer Tom Wolfe (not the author of the same name) stated that the script was intended to be more of an ensemble piece than the buddy comedy the studio saw it as. Farley's assistant, Ted Dondanville, stated that in post-production, cuts were made around the star and targeted peripheral characters. He felt that the lost material would have helped Farley's performance. "They cut the ensemble scenes first, Matthew Perry's second, and Chris's never."

A scene featuring Edwards' sweetheart, played by Parker Posey, was cut, as was the film's original ending. The re-shot ending did not include Bokeem Woodbine, resulting in his character Jonah disappearing after the fight against the conquistadors.

== Reception ==
Critical reception of Almost Heroes has been generally negative. On the review aggregator website Rotten Tomatoes, 5% of 39 critics' reviews are positive, with an average rating of 3.1/10. The website's consensus reads: "A sorry swan song for the talented Chris Farley, Almost Heroes is a directionless comedy that doesn't even come close to triumph."

James Berardinelli of ReelViews gave the film one out of four stars and wrote: "This is a dreadful motion picture - a lowbrow example of period piece comedy with terrible production values and an exceptionally poor laughs-to-jokes ratio. There's a kind of desperation in the movie's approach to humor that reveals the film makers' uncertainty about how entertaining the material is; the manic style betrays itself as a last-ditch attempt to hide the flaws of a failed script." Owen Gleiberman of Entertainment Weekly wrote: "Almost Heroes [...] gives off the discomforting reek of desperation. ... How could director Christopher Guest [...] have reduced himself to staging gags such as Farley's slap-fest with hostile Injuns, Eugene Levy (as a nasty pirate) speaking in a zany French accent, or Farley stealing an egg from an eagle's nest, punching out the bird, and then falling to the ground with an epic thud? Almost Heroes goes thud too. Despite his compulsion to trash everything in his midst, including himself, Chris Farley deserved better." John R. McEwen of Film Quips Online wrote: "It's clear, his death notwithstanding, that Farley is the funniest thing about this... As expected, there is little here but sight gags and low humor, but if you're in the mood (and I must have been), it has its laugh-out-loud moments. ... Perry also has a few good bits, but he is obviously a distant second banana. Additional appearances by people like Eugene Levy and Kevin Dunn, and others, add to the hilarity, although many of the jokes fall flat...I doubt if anyone ever expected Chris Farley to win an Academy Award. But it is a fitting tribute to him that his last outing, while not a great work of American cinema, can provide a good dose of chuckles, and more than a few belly laughs."

The film has also received more favorable retrospective assessments, particularly as an outdoor comedy. In a 2020 review, Cottage Country Mix described the film as an outdoor comedy and highlighted its portaging, river travel, campfire scenes, and wilderness setting. In another retrospective positive review, outdoor industry entrepreneur and writer Nathan Baller praised the film's blend of physical comedy, ensemble performances, and wilderness adventure. While acknowledging that some scenes are underwhelming considering the star power, Baller argued that Farley and Perry "reach their full comedic potential" in several scenes and described the film as a "hidden gem" for fans of outdoor adventure and 1990s nostalgia.

One of the film's producers, Denise Di Novi, reflected on the failure of the end product:

The script was brilliant. We even hired Christopher Guest to direct it. I've thought so many times about what went wrong. I always like to say I have the distinction of making the only unsuccessful Christopher Guest movie. You never know with movies. It's kind of like alchemy; the chemistry just didn't work. It had all the right actors. It had a great director, a great script. But I think the tone of the comedy was very odd. It almost read better than it played. It wanted to be a quirky, British, Black Adder type of comedy, and here we had Chris Farley and Matthew Perry. It was just a weird combination.

— Denise Di Novi

== See also ==
- Wagons East – 1994 film by Peter Markle
