= Severin Schwan =

Businessman (born 1967)

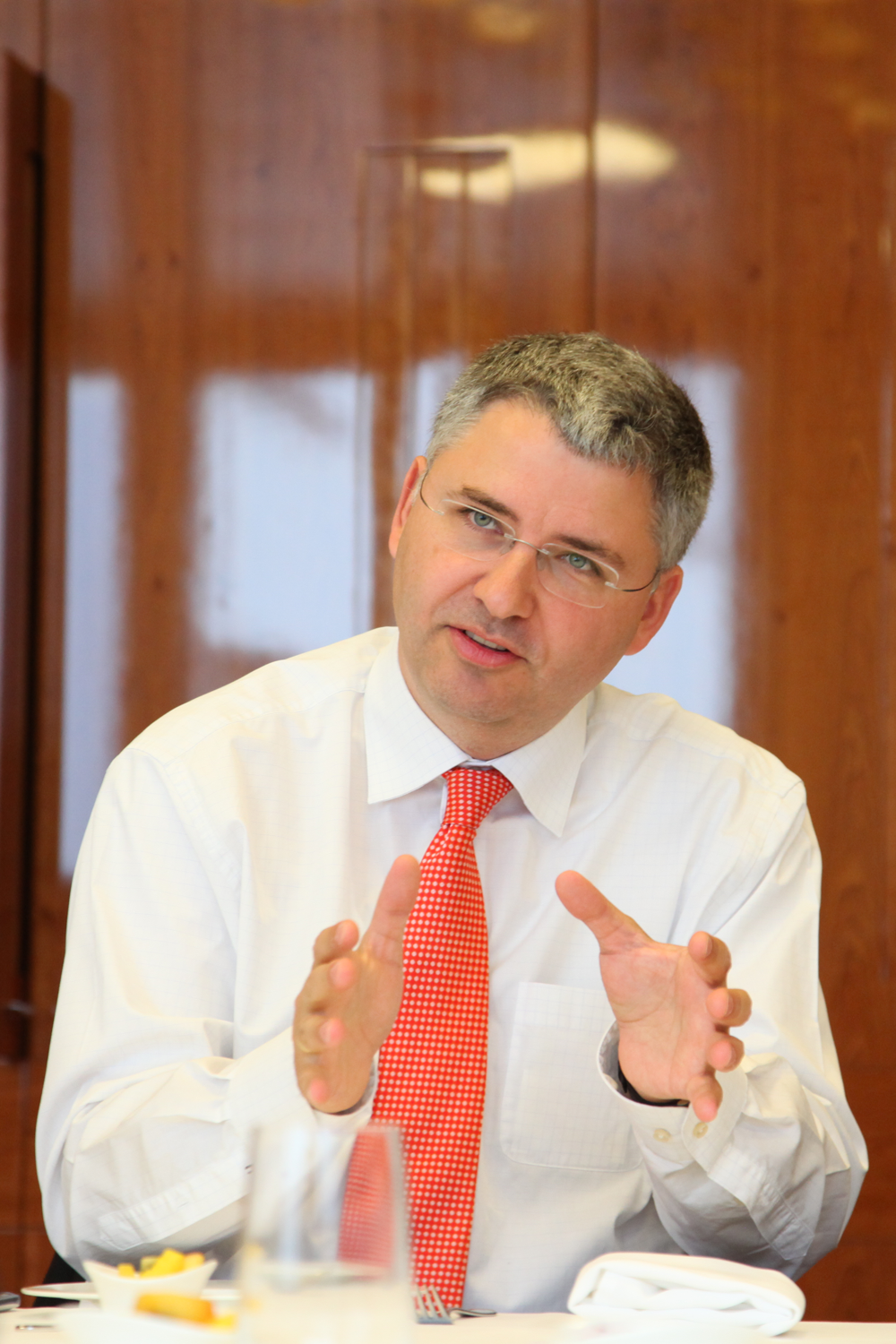
- Schwan in 2012
- Born: Severin Anton Schwan; 17 November 1967 (age 58); Hall in Tirol, Austria
- Citizenship: Austria; Germany; Switzerland (from 2020)
- Education: Akademisches Gymnasium Innsbruck
- Alma mater: University of Innsbruck; University of York; University of Oxford
- Title: Chairman of the Board of Roche Holding AG
- Spouse: Ingeborg Stix (m. 1995)
- Children: 3

Severin Anton Schwan (born 17 November 1967) is an Austrian business executive. He is the current chairman of the board and former CEO (2008–2023) of the Roche Group.

Schwan joined the Roche Group in 1993 as a trainee and has stayed with the company ever since.

== Early life and education ==
Severin Schwan graduated from the Akademisches Gymnasium Innsbruck and then studied economics at the University of Innsbruck, University of York, and University of Oxford as well as law at the University of Innsbruck. He completed both subjects in 1991 with a master's degree and acquired the title Mag. iur. and Mag. rer. soc. oec. He then obtained his Doctorate in Law in 1993.

== Career ==
Schwan started his career as a trainee at the Roche office in Basel, Switzerland. He has worked in a number of positions across the globe for Roche. He was appointed CEO of the Roche Group at its Annual General Meeting on 4 March 2008, replacing Franz B. Humor. Previously, Schwan was managing director of Roche's Diagnostics Division.

He has been a member of the Board of Directors of Roche Holding AG since 2013. At the Annual General Meeting on 14 March 2023, he was elected chairman of the Board of Directors, succeeding Christoph Franz. Thomas Schinecker became Schwan's successor as CEO.

From 2014 to 2022, he was a member of the board of directors of Credit Suisse, and from 2017 its vice chairman. He stepped down from the position of vice-chair in March 2022.

== Memberships ==
He was on the board at Chugai Pharmaceutical Co., Ltd. Schwan has been a member of the International Business Leaders Advisory Council for the Mayor of Shanghai (IBLAC) since 2009 and Vice President since 2022.

From 2016 to 2020, he was Vice President of the International Federation of Pharmaceutical Manufacturers & Associations (IFPMA).

== Personal life ==
Born to an Austrian-German family, Schwan is citizen of both countries. He was also granted Swiss citizenship in 2020. Schwan is married, has three children and lives in the Basel suburb of Riehen.
