= Serpent's Lair =

- Theatrical release poster
- Directed by: Jeffrey Reiner
- Written by: Marc Rosenberg
- Produced by: Harriet Brown, Peter Locke, Vlad Paunescu
- Starring: Jeff Fahey, Lisa Barbuscia, Patrick Bauchau, Anthony Palermo
- Cinematography: Feliks Parnell
- Edited by: Virginia Katz
- Music by: Vinny Golia
- Production companies: Castel Films, The Kushner-Locke Company
- Distributed by: Republic Pictures Home Video, Warner Vision Entertainment
- Release date: October 19, 1995 (Hamptons Film Festival)
- Running time: 90 min
- Country: United States
- Language: English
- Budget: $4,000,000

Serpent's Lair is a 1995 American horror film directed by Jeffrey Reiner and starring Jeff Fahey, Lisa Barbuscia, Patrick Bauchau, and Anthony Palermo. The film premiered on 19 October 1995 in the Hamptons Film Festival. The plot concentrates on a young man who is seduced by an evil succubus intent on destroying his marriage and killing him.

== Plot ==
Newlyweds Tom and Alex move into a gloomy old apartment in Los Angeles. Soon cats start congregating around the house, one of them causes Alex to fall from the stairs, effectively sending her to the hospital and leaving Tom alone in the apartment. While she is away, Tom is visited by a strange, seductive woman, Lilith, who informs him that she has come to collect the remaining property of a former tenant, her recently deceased brother. Lilith has a special feline grace; she sneaks into the apartment and then makes aggressive moves to seduce Tom. Soon he gives into the lure of rough sex. Lilith turns out to be an insatiable lover. Tom feels so exhausted that he begins seeing terrifying satanic hallucinations. When Alex finds out about his affair, she leaves Tom. Lilith then moves in, and soon Tom finds himself becoming both physically drained and mentally collapsed. Gradually, he comes to realise that Lilith is, in fact, an ancient demonic succubus who intends to drain all his energy and semen to reproduce. Fortunately, Tom has his friends and relatives on his side who help him get rid of the demon.

== Cast ==
- Jeff Fahey as Tom Bennett
- Lisa Barbuscia as Lilith Cameron
- Heather Medway as Alex Bennett
- Patrick Bauchau as Samuel Goddard
- Anthony Palermo as Mario
- Kathleen Noone as Betty
- Taylor Nichols as Paul Douglas

== Filming ==
The film was shot in Bucharest, Romania from 22 May to 17 June 1995.

== See also ==
- Fatal Attraction (1987)
- Basic Instinct (1992)
- Mental illness in film
