= Robert A. Swanson =

American venture capitalist

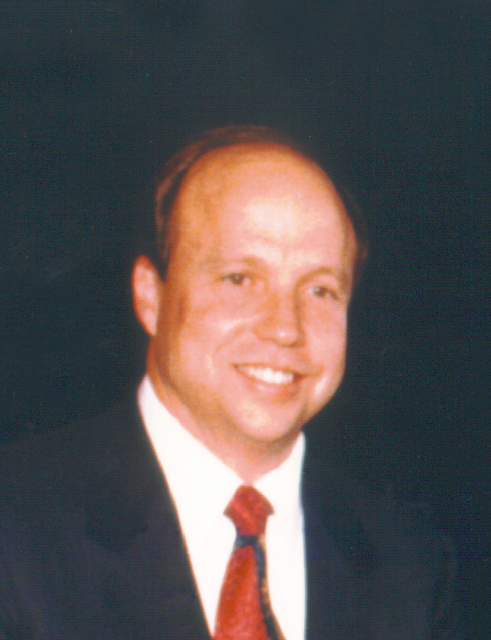
- Robert A. Swanson
- Born: 1947; United States
- Died: December 6, 1999 (aged 51–52)
- Education: Massachusetts Institute of Technology
- Known for: Genentech, Biotechnology, Venture Capital
- Spouse: Judy (m. 1980)

Robert "Bob" Swanson (1947–1999) was an American venture capitalist who co-founded Genentech in 1976 with Herbert Boyer. Genentech is one of the leading biotechnology companies in the world. He was CEO of Genentech from 1976 to 1990, and chairman from 1990 to 1996.

Swanson graduated from the Massachusetts Institute of Technology, where he was a member of the Sigma Chi fraternity. He completed a B.S. degree in Chemistry as well as a master's degree in Management from the MIT Sloan School of Management. Both degrees were conferred in 1970.

He is regarded as an instrumental figure in launching the biotechnology revolution. The authors of the book, 1,000 Years, 1,000 People: Ranking the Men and Women Who Shaped the Millennium ranked Mr. Swanson number 612. Mr. Swanson was inducted into the Junior Achievement U. S. Business Hall of Fame in 2006. He received the 2000 Biotechnology Heritage Award posthumously with Herbert Boyer.

On December 6, 1999, he succumbed to glioblastoma, a type of brain cancer, at the age of 52.

== Early life and education ==
Robert S. Swanson was born in Brooklyn, New York, in 1947 to Arthur J. Swanson and Arline Baker Swanson. Arthur Swanson was an airplane electrical maintenance crew leader, and worked in shifts.

According to Swanson, he was taught from an early age that his generation would do better than the last generation of his family. It was because of this that his family wanted him to be the first to obtain a college degree. His family was particularly interested in the Massachusetts Institute of Technology (MIT). Much to his family's pride, Swanson was accepted into MIT in 1965.

Even though he was majoring in chemistry, he realized later during his undergraduate education that he preferred working with people, rather than in research. What follows is an excerpt from a 1996 interview that describes how he came to this realization: "At the end of my junior year, I... got a summer job working for a chemical company... One of the things I discovered was that I enjoyed people more than things. So I said, 'Gee, this probably isn't going to be what I'd want to do all my life,'".

As a result, Swanson petitioned MIT to be able to take the first year's courses at the Alfred P. Sloan School of Management for a master's degree, and they allowed him to do so. Thanks to the graduate courses he took, he realized that he was particularly interested in two things: organizational development, and the commercialization of innovative ideas. He graduated from MIT in 1970, with an undergraduate degree in chemistry and a Master of Science degree in management.

== Early career ==
After graduating from MIT, Swanson took a job at Citibank, where he managed a venture investment group. His performance pleased his supervisors, and he and a colleague were chosen to open a San Francisco office for Citicorp Venture Capital. However, the new Citicorp investments were not doing well. One particular failure, which Swanson later believed to have been a lucky break, was the bankruptcy of Antex, a science based company that Citicorp had invested in. He worked with Eugene Kleiner, another Citicorp executive, to attempt to get some money out of the company's bankruptcy. Eugene Kleiner was the cofounder of the venture capital partnership Kleiner & Perkins.

Swanson left Citicorp and joined Kleiner & Perkins in 1974, under the recommendation of Eugene Kleiner himself. As an associate, Swanson spent a lot of time and effort attempting to convince the heads of the science company Cetus, one which Kleiner and Perkins had invested in, to pursue genetic recombination projects. His interest in the technology had been piqued in a lunch with famed scientist and Nobel laureate Donald Glaser. However, the company refused to take on such a risky endeavor, and Kleiner & Perkins parted ways with the company. This falling out was one of the main reasons for the group's decision to advise Swanson to look for another job. Kleiner & Perkins had decided that they would rather work alone, and by the end of 1975, Swanson's position there would be terminated.

== Beginnings of Genentech ==
A young Swanson now found himself unemployed. Swanson was interviewing almost daily, attempting to find a job. However, he was still fascinated by the potential of recombinant DNA technology, and decided to cold call scientists working on the technology, with the hope that one of them would be interested in commercializing it. One of the scientists he contacted, Herbert Boyer, expressed interest but was hesitant of meeting up with Swanson at first. Boyer was an academic scientist, and was not well versed on the matters of business. Swanson convinced Boyer to meet, for a short time, at his University of California, San Francisco lab.

The short meeting was extended to three hours, and Boyer came out determined to commercialize the technology he had helped pioneer. He would deal with the science behind the product, whereas Swanson would work on obtaining funds, and managing the organization as a whole. The two agreed to form a partnership, and each put down $500 to cover legal fees.

Swanson made the decision to pursue the creation of the company full-time, rather than obtain a job at an established institution or company. He explains his logic in an interview: "(I told myself) "Look, I think this is important. If I don't do this, I'm not going to like myself so much for not having given it a shot." So that was what made that decision."

Swanson then set out to identify their first marketable product, and quickly focused on the human protein insulin. From a scientific standpoint, it was a well characterized protein, whose structure had already been elucidated, making it easier to work with, in theory. Additionally, the widely available insulin at the time was pig insulin, and many people presented allergic reactions to this insulin. Human insulin, then, was preferable, for it was believed that people would not have allergic reactions to it. From a business standpoint, there was a large market for insulin; at the time, world sales were greater than $100 million, and growing. Boyer agreed that the insulin hormone should be their first target molecule.

After concluding the market research, Swanson prepared Genentech's first business proposal by March 1976. It was with this proposal that Swanson pitched Genentech to Kleiner & Perkins. Perkins later explained that they considered the technical risks to be enormous: "(The risk of failure was) Very high. I figured better than 50–50 we'd lose it... (However) If it worked, the rewards would be obvious.". Boyer's scientific expertise and Swanson's business plan convinced the venture capitalists. While acknowledging the tremendous risk associated with the company, Kleiner and Perkins promised to invest $100,000 in Genentech. This was just a small fraction of Kleiner and Perkins's $8 million venture capital fund.

== Career at Genentech ==
Because of the Kleiner and Perkins investment, Swanson and Boyer dissolved their partnership and created the legal entity Genentech. Kleiner and Perkins provided $100,000 on the May closing, and acquired 20,000 shares of preferred stock from Genentech. Swanson was made the president and treasurer of Genentech, and received a $2,500 per month salary, along with 25,000 shares. This marked the end of Swanson's unemployment, and the beginning of his career at Genentech.

With funding secured, and the organizational structure formed, the first logical step forward was to begin experimenting with the procedure for the synthesis of insulin. Since Genentech lacked any laboratories of its own, the Boyer lab, as well as two other labs in the San Francisco area, were to be subcontracted to carry out the experiments.

However, the scientists quickly realized that a step wise approach would be more practical; rather than immediately engineer a bacterium that synthesized insulin, they would engineer a bacterium that could synthesize somatostatin, a smaller hormone. Swanson resisted at first, since he believed that “If you are going to go for something, go for the real thing.” the "real thing" being insulin, in this case. He eventually agreed, albeit grudgingly.

With a new research goal set up, Swanson proceeded to establish official research agreements with the institutions. He set up research agreements with the University of California and the City of Hope. Then, in early 1977, Swanson began a second round of funding, to jumpstart the somatostatin research. He raised approximately $850,000 by February, enough money to fund the somatostatin research projects. By August 1977, the research teams managed to create the first bacterium capable of synthesizing somatostatin. This was the proof of concept that the fledgling company sought. On December 2, 1977, Swanson and the scientists held a press conference announcing their findings.

Following their success with the proof of concept, Swanson then directed the scientists to pursue the creation of a bacterium that synthesized human insulin. Two other scientific teams were already attempting to carry out such a project, but Swanson moved quickly to ensure that they synthesized it first. By early 1978, his priorities were to obtain a lab space for the scientists, corporate contracts, and more funding for Genentech.

In order to attract the best scientists, Swanson, with the assistance of Boyer, tried to create an attractive environment for academic scientists. It was because of this that scientists at Genentech were allowed to publish their findings in scientific journals. The restriction was that they could publish only after the appropriate patents had already been filed.

By February 1978, Swanson leased a 10,000-square-foot section of an airfreight warehouse, which would serve as Genentech's first lab space. Later that year, Swanson also secured a partnership with Eli Lilly; Genentech would receive $50,000 a month to pursue the human insulin project. By August 1978, the Genentech scientists were able to synthesize human insulin, and in that same month, Swanson and colleagues negotiated a multimillion-dollar contract with Eli Lilly. The big company-small company relationship they developed became the eventual template for other biotechnology start ups. While there was still plenty of work to be done on the human insulin synthesis, the new stream of revenues and the significant amount of media coverage meant that Genentech could pursue other research projects. By 1979, Genentech had projects on interferons, animal growth hormones, hepatitis B vaccines, and the hormone thymosin.

By 1980, Swanson decided that they should raise money by making Genentech public. This was due to a variety of factors. Genentech needed more money to continue its development, and Swanson believed that the public interest in the technology should be capitalized on. The initial public offering took place on October 14, 1980, and it was the largest IPO ever, at that moment in history, with Genentech raising 35 million dollars. A trip to Europe in September 1980 to raise interest from European investors before the IPO also served as his honeymoon.

From here on, Swanson would focus on pursuing his vision of Genentech as a self sustainable biotechnology company, not a contract research operation. He believed that recombinant growth hormones had a large market in the United States, and that they would be key for Genentech's corporate evolution. By October 18, 1985, the FDA approved the human growth hormone, developed almost entirely by Genentech, for sale in the United States, under the commercial name Protropin. In just two decades, Protropin sales exceeded $2 billion. Genentech had been able to manufacture, receive federal approval for, and market its own product, marking the successful execution of Swanson's plan to form out of Genentech a self sustainable biotech firm. Swanson left his position as CEO in 1990, taking on the position of chairman until his retirement from Genentech in 1996.

== Legacy ==
Robert Swanson's legacy can still be found to this day through the company he cofounded and led. Genentech continues to develop and produce therapeutic drugs, and some of his policies, such as allowing company scientists to publish, are still in place. Genentech scored many firsts under Swanson's leadership, such as developing the first drug produced via genetic engineering, being the first biotechnology company to go public, and being the first biotechnology company to sell its own drug. These accomplishments have earned Genentech, and Swanson, a place in the history of the biotechnology industry.

== Awards and honors ==
The following is a list of the awards and honors received by Robert Swanson.

- Entrepreneur of the Year, Recipient 1981 (Awarded by the Research Directors' Association of Chicago)
- Entrepreneur of the Year, Recipient 1983 (Awarded by Stanford Business School Alumni Association, Peninsula Chapter)
- Golden Plate Award of the American Academy of Achievement, Recipient 1986
- Distinguished Entrepreneur of the Year, Recipient 1993 (Awarded by Babson College)
- Exemplary Leadership in Management Award, Recipient 1997 (Anderson School of Business)
- National Medal of Technology, Recipient 1999
- Biotechnology Heritage Medal, Recipient 2000 (Posthumously Awarded by the Biotechnology Industry Organization and the Chemical Heritage Foundation)
- Royal Swedish Academy of Engineering Sciences, Appointed Member
