= Dingo (film) =

- Directed by: Rolf de Heer
- Written by: Marc Rosenberg
- Produced by: Rolf de Heer; Giorgio Draskovic; Marie-Pascale Osterrieth; Marc Rosenberg
- Starring: Colin Friels; Miles Davis; Helen Buday
- Cinematography: Denis Lenoir
- Edited by: Suresh Ayyar
- Music by: Miles Davis; Michel Legrand
- Production company: Gevest Australia Productions
- Distributed by: Greycat Films; Umbrella Entertainment
- Release dates: 1991 (Hof International Film Festival); 31 January 1992 (Australia)
- Running time: 109 minutes
- Countries: Australia; France
- Language: English
- Budget: A$5 million

Dingo is a 1991 Australian-French drama musical film directed by Rolf de Heer and written by Marc Rosenberg. It is notable for marking Miles Davis' first and only speaking role in a narrative feature film.

== Synopsis ==
The story traces the pilgrimage of John Anderson, an average guy with a passion for jazz, from his home in outback Western Australia to the jazz clubs of Paris, to meet his idol, jazz trumpeter Billy Cross. In the film's opening sequence, Cross and his band unexpectedly land on a remote airstrip for repairs in the Australian outback and proceed to perform for the stunned locals.

== Cast ==
- Colin Friels – John Anderson
- Miles Davis – Billy Cross
- Helen Buday – Jane Anderson
- Joe Petruzzi – Peter
- Brigitte Catillon – Beatrice Boulain
- Bernard Fresson – Jacques Boulain
- Bernadette Lafont – Angie Cross
- Helen Doig – Ruth
- Eric Oldfield – Rod Fraser

== Production ==
The movie was filmed in Meekatharra, Perth, and Sandstone, Western Australia, as well as Paris, France.

Christian Faure was the assistant director of the movie.

=== Music ===
Davis, who plays the role of Cross, provided the film's soundtrack in cooperation with Michel Legrand.

== Box office ==
Dingo grossed $132,500 at the box office in Australia.

== Reception ==
According to Ozmovies:

Despite the presence of Miles Davis, the film also didn’t travel well internationally and struggled for attention, though his presence also has ensured the film’s ongoing status as a cult item, offsetting the unfulfilled award, critical and commercial hopes...
... the film was at the time criticised for being an unrealistic and unlikely romantic fairy tale, but jazz enthusiasts defensively rushed to dig out stories of Australia’s best jazz saxophonist, Bernie McGann, who, while working as a postman, went out into the bush to practise.

== Home media ==
Dingo was released on DVD by Umbrella Entertainment in July 2005. The DVD is compatible with all region codes and includes special features such as a new 5.1 channel soundtrack, trailers, and an image gallery.

Umbrella Entertainment released a Region B Blu-ray of Dingo in 2021, with extra features including interviews with Rolf de Heer and Helen Buday and a rushes reel with audio commentary by Rolf de Heer.

== See also ==
- Cinema of Australia
- South Australian Film Corporation
