= Shawn Michael Howard =

American actor (born 1969)

- Born: July 31, 1969 (age 56); Newark, New Jersey
- Occupation: Actor
- Children: Elijah
- Website: http://www.shawnmichaelhoward.com

Shawn Michael Howard (born July 31, 1969) is an American film, television and theater actor.

Howard was born in Newark, New Jersey, the son of Olivia C. and Frank Howard, Jr., brother of Brad Howard and Tyrone Scott Howard. Father of Elijah Howard Shawn moved to Manhattan at age 19 to study acting at New York University. He began working off-Broadway while still in school, in Mac Wellman's Crowbar, which won the obie for Best Play. He worked in character roles on episodic television in New York City, and his first film role came opposite Tupac Shakur in Above the Rim. In 1994 he moved to Hollywood and starred in Sunset Park with Terrence Howard. A succession of recurring television roles led to his breakthrough role as Russell on the NBC sitcom The Single Guy in 1995. He has been a featured guest voice on many animated shows, including American Dad!, Family Guy, and Robot Chicken. He voiced the character "Smokey" on the animated series The PJs with Eddie Murphy.

== Filmography ==
=== Film ===
Year	Title	Role	Notes
1994	Above The Rim	Bobby	
1996	Flirting with Disaster	Roger	
1996	The Cable Guy	Basketball Player	
1996	Sunset Park	Kurt	
1997	Plump Fiction	Lee	
1998	Thursday	Jimmy	
1998	The Velocity of Gary	Coco	
2000	Ritual	Mason Becker	
2000	Men of Honor	Junie	
2001	Note come due	RJ	Short
2001	3000 Miles to Graceland	Roller Elvis	
2003	Masked and Anonymous	Nestor	
2003	Victor and Eddie	Victor	Short
2005	Extreme Dating	Detective Rawlings	
2009	Next Day Air	Derrick	
2011	The Inheritance	Simpson	
2016	Desolation		

=== Television ===
Year	Title	Role	Notes
1993	Law & Order	Franco	Episode: "Profile"
1996	Married... with Children	Barney	2 episodes
1996	Nash Bridges	Antoine	2 episodes
1996-97	The Single Guy	Russell	21 episodes
1997	Soul Train	Guest Host	Episode: "Deborah Cox/Westside Connection/Day Ta Day"
1997	413 Hope St.		Episode: "A Better Place"
1997	Mr. Show with Bob and David	Todd	Episode: "Oh, You Men"
1997-98	The Practice	Warren Cruickshank	3 episodes
1998	Smart Guy	Mitchell Harrison	Episode: "My Two Dads"
1998	Martial Law	Rickey Dukes	Episode: "Shanghai Express"
1998-2003	NYPD Blue	"Flossy" Carver / Dino	2 episodes
1998	Ally McBeal	Ben	2 episodes
1998	Cupid	Shawn	Episode: "Hung Jury"
1999-2001	The PJ's	Smokey (voice)	41 episodes
1999	Jack & Jill	Theodore Kincaid	Episode: "Welcome to the Working Week"
2001	Boycott	Fred Gray	TV movie
2001	Becker	Clay	Episode: "Nocturnal Omissions"
2001	It's Like, You Know...	Patrick	Episode: "Hoop Dreams"
2002	The Rats	Ty	TV movie
2003	The Pitts	VW Bug	Episode: "A Bug's Wife"
2006-08	American Dad!	Man (voice) / Chris The Homeless Guy (voice) / Belmonpan (voice)	4 episodes
2012	Cops Uncuffed	Officer Todd Dawson	TV movie
2017	Family Guy	New Orleans Band (voice)	Episode: "The Peter Principal"
2018	Motown Magic	Clarence (voice)	3 episodes
2019	The Rookie	Peter Langston	Episode: "Free Fall"

=== Videogames ===
Year	Title	Role	Notes
2008	Lost: Via Domus	Michael Dawson	
2012	Prototype 2	Additional Voices	
2012	Syndicate	Kris	
2013	Grand Theft Auto V	The Local Population	
2013	Dead Rising 3	Additional Voices	
