= Grace McKeaney =

Television writer

Grace McKeaney is an American television writer, playwright, educator, and actor.

She attended Northwestern University and starred as Blanche DuBois in A Streetcar Named Desire by Tennessee Williams. She obtained an MFA in playwriting from the Yale School of Drama. While working on her degree at Yale, she was playwright-in-residence at Evanston Repertory Theatre, and her one-act farce, Fits and Starts, a "soap-opera satire", was performed by the Womyn's Theatre in Seattle in 1978.

In Baltimore, she was a teacher to elementary and junior high classes. She also taught a course in playwriting at Northwestern University.

Even though she has written television episodes of Roseanne, St. Elsewhere, The Client, The Hoop Life and The Education of Max Bickford, she considers herself primarily a playwright.

McKeaney plays a supporting role, 'The Goat Lady,' in 2016 cult thriller "Bender," directed by John Alexander.

She married actor John Getz in 1987. They divorced in 1996. They have one child together, Hannah Getz, a cinematographer.
