= Evan Morris (lobbyist) =

American lawyer and lobbyist

Evan L. Morris (January 26, 1977 – July 9, 2015) was an American lawyer and lobbyist for Genentech and its parent corporation Roche in Washington, D.C.

Morris was a graduate of George Washington University Law School and Union College. He started his professional career in Washington as an intern in the Clinton White House at age 18. He began his lobbying work at law firm Patton Boggs before moving on to Roche in 2005. His early work at Roche involved government policy on Medicare and Medicaid, flu preparedness, and hepatitis C.

His work at Genentech came under investigation after a report by The Wall Street Journal suspected him of embezzlement. The WSJ uncovered that Morris misappropriated millions of dollars for personal gain, describing his actions as "shaping up to be one of the biggest U.S. investigations into Washington's influence business since the bribery and corruption case surrounding lobbyist Jack Abramoff rocked the nation's capital in the mid-2000s." Genentech launched an internal investigation which led to Morris being suspended.

He committed suicide on July 9, 2015, aged 38.
