= University of California finances =

The University of California public university system is funded through both public and private money. Some funds are given directly to each of the system's 10 campuses, while the rest are distributed through the central UC Office of the President. Support given by the state of California to its three-tier higher education system (comprising the University of California, California State University, and California Community College) is presented by the governor every January, and approved by the state legislature at the end of the fiscal year in June. Traditionally, the state of California has been the largest public supporter of the UC system. In response to state budget woes, UC Berkeley Chancellor Robert Birgeneau in 2011 made the claim that his own university is turning into a federal and not a state institution because of the inversion of the proportion of funds given by each jurisdiction since he became Chancellor in 2004.

== Annual budget ==
Depending upon the source of revenue given to the University of California, funds may either be restricted to certain defined expenditures, or are given to the University for unrestricted use. Examples of restricted funding include federal research and infrastructure grants, and private support. Examples of unrestricted funds include student fees (tuition and other fees), state general funds and UC general funds (non-resident tuition, some portions of public contract and grant overhead, some Department of Energy lab fees, patent royalties earned by UC inventions, interest earnings, and application and other fees).

=== 2011–12 ===
The University of California's projected operating revenue for 2011–12 is $21.8B. The state of California provided 13% of the UC's 2011-12 budget. This is a part of the larger core funds for the University of California. It also includes student fees at 12%, ARRA funds at 1%, and UC general funds at 3%. The largest single contributor to the budget comes from medical centers at 25%. ^{[1]}

==== Restricted funding ====
Currently, ~73% of the annual budget of the UC comes from restricted funding sources.

- 27% ($5.987B): UC medical centers
- 19% ($4.312B): Sales, services and auxiliaries funds (these funds include revenue from university cultural centers such as theaters and museums, UC Extension, clinics and other activities)
- 18% ($3.972B): Government contracts & grants
- 7% ($1.675B): Private funds
- 2% ($409M): Other sources

==== Unrestricted funding ====
~27% of the UC annual budget comes from unrestricted funding sources. Unrestricted funding sources support core operations.

- 11% ($2.374B): State General Funds (39% of core operation funds)
- 13% ($2.965B): Student fees (48% of core operation funds)
- 4% ($792M): UC General Funds (13% of core operation funds)

===== Core operational funds =====
Core operational funds total $6.131B.

- 30%: Academic salaries
- 23%: Staff salaries
- 18%: Equipment, utilities and other related expenditures
- 14%: Employee and retiree benefits
- 14%: Student financial aid
- 1%: Senior management salaries

== Investments ==
The University of California's total investment portfolio grew to $180 billion at the end of the 2023-2024 fiscal year, marking a $16 billion increase over the previous year. These investments include the Endowment, Pension, Retirement savings, and Working capital.

The University has divested from fossil fuels as of 2020. It authorized in 1986 the withdrawal of three billion dollars' worth of Divestment from South Africa. Nelson Mandela stated his belief that the University of California's massive divestment was particularly significant in abolishing white-minority rule in South Africa.

=== Endowment ===
- The UC endowment, which includes the General Endowment Pool and the Blue and Gold Endowment Pool, stood at $29.5 billion as of June 30, 2024, up from $23.4 billion the year before.
- The General Endowment Pool was at $22.6 billion, with a 30-year annualized net return of 9.3%, a 20-year return of 7.9%, a 10-year return of 8.1%, a five-year return of 9.4%, and a one-year net return of 11.7%.
- The Blue and Gold Endowment Pool, which is 100% passive and low-cost to manage, stood at $6.9 billion, with a three-year return of 3.6% and a one-year net return of 15.7%.

=== Pension Fund ===
- The UC pension fund's asset value rose to $98.6 billion as of June 30, 2024, up from $88.3 billion the year before, with five- and 10-year annualized returns of 7.9% and 6.9%, respectively, and 20- and 30-year annualized net returns of 6.9% and 8.6%, respectively.

=== Working Capital ===
- The UC Working Capital, which includes the Total Return Investment Pool and the Short-Term Investment Pool, stood at $12.8 billion as of June 30, 2024, down from $18.7 billion the year before.
- The Total Return Investment Pool was at $9.8 billion, with a 15-year annualized net return of 7%, a 10-year return of 5.1%, a five-year return of 5.9%, and a one-year net return of 12.1%.
- The Short-Term Investment Pool was at $3 billion, with a 30-year annualized net return of 3.6%, a 25-year return of 3.1%, a 20-year return of 2.6%, a 10-year return of 2%, a five-year return of 2.4%, and a one-year net return of 5.4%.

=== Retirement Savings Program ===
The UC Retirement Savings Program, the nation's second-largest public defined contribution plan, stood at $39 billion as of June 30, 2024, up from $33.7 billion the year before.

== See also ==
- California Master Plan for Higher Education
