= Raven Property Group =

British property investment company

- Company type: Public
- Traded as: LSE: RUS MCX: RAVN
- Industry: Property
- Founded: 2005
- Headquarters: St. Peter Port, Guernsey
- Key people: Richard Jewson, (Chairman); Glyn Hirsch (CEO)
- Revenue: £175.4 million (2019)
- Operating income: £172.6 million (2019)
- Net income: £46 million (2019)
- Website: www.theravenpropertygroup.com

Raven Property Group Limited (formerly Raven Russia) is a property investment company specialising in commercial property in Russia. It is listed on the London Stock Exchange and is a former constituent of the FTSE 250 Index.

== History ==
The company was founded by Anton Bilton and Glyn Hirsch, two British property entrepreneurs, who were interested in property in Russia. It was floated on the Alternative Investment Market as Raven Russia in July 2005 and moved to the main market in 2010.

In June 2018, the company announced a change of name from Raven Russia to Raven Property Group.

== Operations ==
The company's property portfolio was valued at £1.37bn as at 31 December 2019.
