= Joey Slotnick =

American film actor and voice actor (born 1968)

- Slotnick at the 2026 New York Film Festival
- Born: Joseph Slotnick; October 2, 1968 (age 58); Chicago, Illinois, U.S.
- Occupations: Actor, voice actor
- Years active: 1986–present

Joseph Slotnick (born October 2, 1968) is an American actor. He is known for roles in Twister (1996), Blast from the Past (1999), Hollow Man (2000), Elevator (2011), The Single Guy (1995–1997), and Nip/Tuck (2003–2006).

== Life and career ==
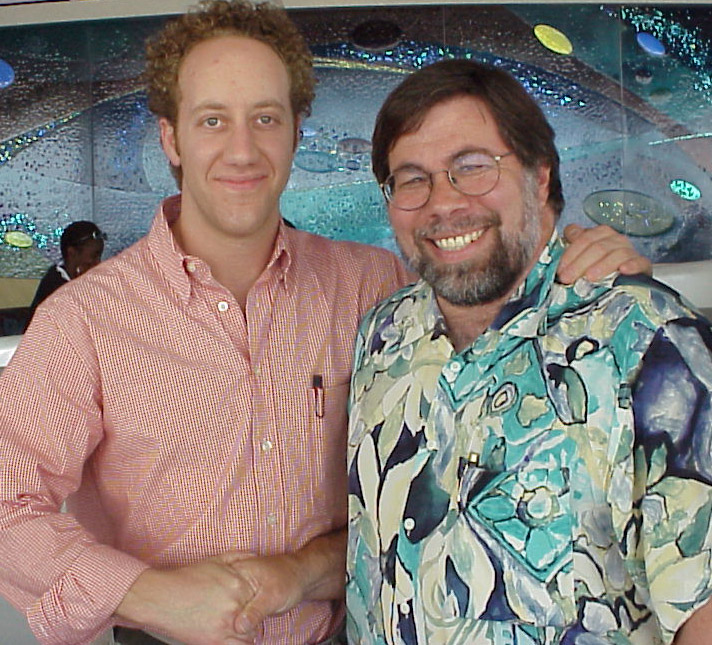
Slotnick (left) poses with Steve Wozniak, whom he portrayed in the film Pirates of Silicon Valley.

Slotnick was born in Chicago, Illinois, and graduated from Chaparral High School in Las Vegas, Nevada. His film roles include computer industry pioneer Steve Wozniak in the film Pirates of Silicon Valley and a part in the 1996 blockbuster Twister. In 2011, he completed the suspense film Elevator, in which he plays one of several people trapped in a New York elevator with an evil presence. He was also in the cast of the television shows Boston Public in 2000–2001, The Single Guy from 1995 to 1997, and Nip/Tuck from 2003 to 2006.

In 2009, Slotnick played Groucho Marx's role of Captain Jeffrey Spaulding in The Goodman Theatre's production of Animal Crackers. The performance was nominated for a Joseph Jefferson Award for best actor.

Slotnick also does commercial work, including ads for the NBA, 21st Century Insurance, Staples and Verizon Fios.

== Credits ==
=== Film ===
Year	Film	Role	Notes
1992	A League of Their Own	Doris's Fan #2	
1996	Twister	Joey	
1997	Dinner and Driving	Jason	
1998	Judas Kiss	Walters	
1999	Blast from the Past	Soda Jerk	
1999	Idle Hands	Burger Jungle Manager	
2000	Hollow Man	Frank Chase	
2004	Memron	Donald Westerfeld	
2006	I Want Someone to Eat Cheese With	Larry	
2008	Brief Interviews with Hideous Men	Tad / Subject #59	
2010	Made in Romania	Ronald Krapner	
2011	Elevator	George Axelrod	
2012	The Dictator	Homeless Man	
2013	Tuna	Wes	
2013	The Secret Life of Walter Mitty	Retirement Home Administrator	
2014	The Cobbler	Mr. Slick	
2018	Humor Me	Zimmerman	
2019	The Goldfinch	Dave (Theo's Psychiatrist)	
2023	Plane	Sinclair	
2024	Drive-Away Dolls	Arliss	
2025	Merv	Dr. Zubrovsky	
2026	A Statement	John Laurmann	

=== Television ===
Year	Film	Role	Notes
1995	Ellen	Mr. Selman	Episode: "The Apartment Hunt"
1995	Beverly Hills, 90210	Tuck	Episode: "Unreal World"
1995–1997	The Single Guy	Sam Sloan / Mark Sloan	43 episodes
1997	Working	Jimmy Clarke	Episode: "Pilot"
1997	The Nanny	Brian Levine	Episode: "Fransom"
1998	Since You've Been Gone	Zane Levy	TV movie
1999	Pirates of Silicon Valley	Steve Wozniak	TV movie
1999–2006	Family Guy	Various (voice)	8 episodes
2000–2001	Boston Public	Milton Buttle	14 episodes
2002	Alias	Steven Haladki	5 episodes
2003	CSI: Crime Scene Investigation	Marty Gibson	Episode: "Got Murder?"
2003	Rock Me Baby	Joe Boyle	Episode: "Pilot"
2003–2006	Nip/Tuck	Dr. Merril Bobolit	6 episodes
2004	Curb Your Enthusiasm	Marvin	Episode: "Wandering Bear"
2004	Entourage	Waiter	Episode: "Busey and the Beach"
2004–2005	LAX	Warren	2 episodes
2005	Medium	Brett Carter	Episode: "Jump Start"
2005	Ghost Whisperer	Cliff Aimes	Episode: "Mended Hearts"
2006	Law & Order: Special Victims Unit	Walter Camp	Episode: "Class"
2007	Boston Legal	Simon Griffin	Episode: "Tea and Sympathy"
2008	Miss Guided	Mr. Turner	Episode: "Frenemies"
2009	Pushing Daisies	Jimmy Neptune	Episode: "Kerplunk"
2010	The Office	Jerry	Episode: "Sabre"
2011	Too Big to Fail	Dan Jester	TV movie
2013	Psych	Leo Quinn	Episode: "No Trout About It"
2014	Growing Up Fisher		Episode: "The Man with the Spider Tattoo"
2014	Unforgettable	Larry Weinstock	Episode: "Moving On"
2015–2016	The Good Wife	Anthony Dudewitz	2 episodes
2016	Blue Bloods	Show Writer Klein	Episode: "The Price Of Justice"
2018	Murphy Brown	Brandon	Episode: "#MurphyToo"
2018	The Deuce		Episode: "Inside the Pretend"
2018–2019	The Marvelous Mrs. Maisel	Dickie	2 episodes
2019	The Goldbergs	Gleb	Episode: "Our Perfect Stranger"
2020	The Blacklist	Frank Merwin	Episode: "The Kazanjian Brothers (No. 156/157)"
2020–2021	Intelligence	Clint	2 episodes
2021	Search Party	Greg Carrots	Episode: "Something Sharp"
2021	Leverage: Redemption	Fake Nate / Milton Friedlander	Episode: "The Mastermind Job"
2022	New Amsterdam	Dr. Antonio Salerno	Episode: "Two Doors"
2022	The Conners	Gabe	Episode: "Crumbs and Couch Surfers"
2025	Chicago Med	Alistair Reed	Episode: "Acid Test"

=== Stage ===
Year	Title	Role	Venue
2000	The Altruists	Ronald	Vineyard Theatre
2008	Almost an Evening	Nelson/Waiter	Bleecker Street Theater
2009	Offices	Elliot / Colleague #1	Linda Gross Theater
2009	Animal Crackers	Captain Spaulding	Goodman Theatre
2011	The New York Idea	Matthew Philimore	Lucille Lortel Theatre
2011	Happy Hour	Man in Parka / Ted	Peter Norton Space
2013	The Big Knife	Buddy Bliss	American Airlines Theatre
2015	Dying For It	Semyon Semyonovich Podeskalnikov	Linda Gross Theater
2016–2017	The Front Page	Wilson	Broadhurst Theatre
2017–2018	Junk	Boris Pronsky	Vivian Beaumont Theater
2018	Nassim	Guest Performer	New York City Center
2019	A Play Is a Poem	Wes/Ed Curtin/Joey Falcone	Mark Taper Forum
2022	Seagull	Trigorin	Steppenwolf Theatre Company
2023	The Lehman Trilogy	Mayer Lehman	TimeLine Theatre Company
2025	Amadeus	Count Johann Kilian von Strack	Steppenwolf Theatre Company
