= Tehmina Sunny =

Actress

- Born: Croydon, England, UK
- Occupations: Actress, Producer, Vocalist
- Height: 170 cm (5 ft 7 in)
- Website: www.tehminasunny.com

Tehmina Sunny is an English actress, violinist, and vocalist. She is of Indian descent.

== Life and career ==
Sunny's career began while she was living in London. After a trip to Los Angeles to study with an acting teacher, she decided to stay in the city and pursue an acting career.

Sunny began to book roles on TV shows including The Following with Kevin Bacon, 24, Heroes, Californication, NCIS, Undercovers written by J. J. Abrams, ABC's Mistresses and The Newsroom by Aaron Sorkin. Her first film role was with Alfonso Cuaron in his Oscar-nominated film Children of Men. She has worked with directors including Mike Figgis, Roland Joffe and Ben Affleck.

In 2013, Sunny competed against 6,000 people and was selected to join the last 20 for the CBS Diversity Showcase program. In November 2014, Screen International named Tehmina as one of their 'LA Stars of Tomorrow'. She portrayed a reporter in the Found footage Thriller The Vatican Tapes in 2015.

She recurred on the CBS show Training Day opposite Bill Paxton and was a series regular on The CW Sci-Fi show Pandora for season 1. In 2020, she joined as a recurring role on season 6 of Chicago Med playing the character Dr. Sabeena Virani.

Sunny also starred in the Netflix drama series Partner Track based on Helen Wan's novel of the same name. The series is filmed in New York and was released on August 26, 2021. In November 2025, Deadline Hollywood reported that Sunny would join the cast of The Social Reckoning, a sequel to the Oscar-winning The Social Network, released in October 2026.

== Personal life ==
Sunny was born in Croydon, England. She received a scholarship for playing the violin and viola. With no previous training, she was a finalist for the BBC cross-country search for acting talent. Sunny attended University of Leeds in England, where she studied Business Information Systems with an emphasis on Artificial Intelligence and Computer Science. Combined with marketing and business studies, this earned her a bachelor of science degree with honours. Her career change into the entertainment industry was unplanned. She divides her time between New York and London.

== Filmography ==
Film
Year	Title	Role	Notes
2006
2006	Children of Men	Zara	Universal
2011	Elevator	Maureen Asana	Quite Nice Productions
2012	Argo	Swissair Ticketing Agent	WB
2012	Amazing Love	Gomer	Hosea Productions
2015	The Vatican Tapes	Reporter	Lionsgate
2015	The Lovers	Sonubai	Corsan
2017	The Mad Genius Project	Angel	Vix Productions
2026	The Social Reckoning	Amal	Sony
Television
Year	Title	Role	Notes
2007	Casualty	Fareeda Khan	Recurring
2008	Heroes	Bridget Bailey	Recurring
2008	Californication	Beautiful Barmaid	Guest Star
2009–2013	NCIS: Naval Criminal Investigative Service	Leyla Shakarji	Recurring
2009	Eleventh Hour	Lyla	Guest Star
2009	Missing	Layla Gudka	Guest Star
2010	Undercovers	Dayita Nasir	Guest Star
2011	Writer's Block	Bina	Series Reg
2012	The Newsroom	Darshana Yadav	Guest Star
2013	Mistresses	Natalie Wade	Recurring
2013	CSI: Crime Scene Investigation	Nailah Fayed	Guest Star
2013	Perception	Rina	Guest Star
2014	The Following	Melissa Evans	Guest Star
2014	24: Live Another Day	Farah	Guest Star
2015	CSI: Cyber	Tanya Shaffer	Guest Star
2015	Battle Creek	Katrina White	Guest Star
2015	Extant	Iris	Recurring
2017	Training Day	Lina Farzan	Recurring
2019	Pandora	Regan Freid	Series Reg
2020 - 2021	Chicago Med	Sabeena Virani	Recurring
2022	Partner Track	Victoria St Clair	Recurring
2024	Law & Order	Kendra Nasser	Guest Star
Video Games
Year	Title	Role	Notes
2015	The Order: 1886	Lakshmi	Lead
