= Anita Briem =

Icelandic actress (born 1982)

Aníta Briem
- Born: 29 May 1982 (age 44); Reykjavík, Iceland
- Education: Royal Academy of Dramatic Art (2004)
- Occupations: Actress and screenwriter
- Years active: 2004–present
- Spouse: Constantine Paraskevopoulos (ex)
- Parent(s): Gunnlaugur Briem; Erna Þórarinsdóttir

Aníta Briem (born 29 May 1982) is an Icelandic actress and screenwriter. She is known for her role as Queen Jane Seymour on The Tudors and her role as Hannah Sigursdóttir in Journey to the Center of the Earth.

== Personal life ==
Anita was born on 29 May 1982, in Reykjavík, Iceland. She is the daughter of drummer Gunnlaugur Briem of Mezzoforte and back-up vocalist Erna Þórarinsdóttir. She started acting when she was nine at the National Theatre of Iceland. She moved to England at the age of sixteen, graduating from the Royal Academy of Dramatic Art in London in 2004, with a BA in Acting Degree (H Level), and having received the John Barton award in Stage Fighting. She was trained in hand-to-hand combat and self-defence with weaponry skills. She is married to actor/director Constantine Paraskevopoulos.

== Career ==
In 2008, Anita starred in Journey to the Center of the Earth as the female action hero lead, and also had major roles in the films Dylan Dog: Dead of Night (2011), and Elevator (2011).

She appeared in the second season of The Tudors, portraying King Henry VIII's third queen consort, Jane Seymour; she was replaced by Annabelle Wallis in the third season after the show was unable to work out conflicting dates with New Line Cinema over her previous commitment to the premiere and press for Journey to the Center of the Earth.

== Writer ==
After living in Los Angeles, in what she says was a culture of ageism dictated by men, she returned to Iceland. After working with four female Icelandic directors, she decided she wanted to create stories herself, that have a real impact; to explore female sexuality and sensuality deeper, rather than women just being sexual objects. In her opinion, in Iceland, women are generally perceived as being sexier, wiser, and more interesting because they are getting older and having children. As a writer, she was able to explore love and how relationships change, hormonally and emotionally, from a women's perspective, creating work such as As Long as We Live a series shown on Iceland’s Channel 2.

== Film and television ==
Film
Year	Film	Role	Notes
2005	The Nun	Eve	
2006	Köld slóð	Elín	English title: Cold Trail
2008	Journey to the Center of the Earth	Hannah Sigursdóttir	Also filmed in 3D
2009	Everything Will Happen Before You Die	Karen	
2010	The Storyteller	Nicole	
2011	Dylan Dog: Dead of Night	Elizabeth	
2011	You, Me & the Circus	Bo	
2011	Queen of Hearts	Claire	Short Film
2011	Elevator	Celine Fouquet	
2012	You, Me & The Circus	Bo	
2015	Queen of Hearts	Claire	
2016	Salt and Fire	Flight Attendant	
2019	The Drone	Corrine Coldwell	
2021	Quake	Saga	
2022	A Letter from Helga	Unnur	(Svar við bréfi Helgu) Film
2023	Wild Game	Hildur	
2025	BFFs	Anita Goode Bonin	film

Television
Year	Title	Role	Notes
2004	Doctors	Anneka Marsh	Episode: "Golden Girl"
2005	Doctor Who	Sally	Episode: "The Christmas Invasion"
2006	The Evidence	Emily Stevens	Episodes: "And the Envelope Please" "Stringers" "Wine and Die" "Yi vs. Li" "Borrowed Time" "Pilot" "Down for the Count"
2008	The Tudors	Jane Seymour	Season Two, 4 episodes
2008	Up Close with Carrie Keagan	Aníta Briem	
2020	The Minister (Ráðherrann)	Steinunn	16 episodes
2020	Venjulegt fólk	Lilja	
2023	Manny	Nikki Maynes	TV film
2023	As Long as We Live (Svo lengi sem við lifum)	Beta	Actress and writer - 6 episodes
2023	Áramótaskaup	various	S1.E58
2025	BFFs	Anita Goode Bonin	film
