= Somatrem =

Pharmaceutical drug

Clinical data
- Trade names: Protropin
- AHFS/Drugs.com: Micromedex Detailed Consumer Information
- ATC code: H01AC02 (WHO)

Identifiers
- CAS Number: 82030-87-3
- DrugBank: DB09098
- ChemSpider: none
- UNII: CU8D464EDW
- KEGG: D05884
- ChEMBL: ChEMBL1201620

Chemical and physical data
- Formula: C_{995}H_{1537}N_{263}O_{301}S_{8}
- Molar mass: 22256.26 g·mol^{−1}

Somatrem, sold under the brand name Protropin, is an analogue of growth hormone (GH).

== Overview ==
Somatrem is a recombinant human growth hormone used for the treatment of short stature due to decreased or absent secretion of endogenous growth hormone.

Somatrem was first marketed under the brand name Protropin by Genentech in 1985. It differs from endogenous growth hormone by the addition of an extra methionine at the N-terminus.

Somatrem has largely been replaced by somatropin, marketed by several companies including by Genentech as the brand Nutropin.
