= Writing workshop =

Writing workshop may refer to:

- Writing circle, a group of like-minded writers supporting each others' work
- Writers workshop (activity), a workshop format for critiquing and revising work
  - Authors' conference or writers' conference, a type of conference to critique work.
  - Clarion Workshop
  - Iowa Writers' Workshop
  - Milford Writer's Workshop
  - Turkey City Writer's Workshop
  - Teachers College Reading & Writing Project's Writing Workshop, a model of teaching writing in American schools
- Writers Workshop (publisher), a Kolkata-based literary publisher
