= International Federation of Pharmaceutical Manufacturers & Associations =

- Abbreviation: IFPMA
- Formation: 1968
- Type: Trade association
- Headquarters: Geneva, Switzerland
- President: Dr Thomas Schinecker, CEO, Roche Group
- Key people: Dr Thomas Schinecker (President) Dr David Reddy (Director General)
- Website: https://www.ifpma.org/

The International Federation of Pharmaceutical Manufacturers & Associations (IFPMA) is a trade association that represents internationally over 90 pharmaceutical companies and associations around the world. IFPMA is based in Geneva and is in official relations with the United Nations where it contributes industry expertise to global health discussions.

It was formed in 1968 and is based in Geneva, Switzerland.

In 2019, IFPMA released a strengthened code of ethics and professional standards. Among the revisions to the code is a prohibition on gifts provided to healthcare professionals. The code revision has been followed by Ethoscope – an open-source, continuously evolving resource that contains diverse guidance designed to keep pace with emerging developments.

The pharmaceutical industry contributes to the Sustainable Development Goals (SDGs), in particular Goal 3 to ensure healthy lives and promote well-being for all at all ages. Today over 35 IFPMA member companies contribute resources and know-how to SDG initiatives partnering with academia, development organizations, NGOs, foundations and other business sectors. There are over 250 collaborations that aim to strengthen health systems and expand quality healthcare access.

IFPMA works in partnership with other members of the global health community to achieve Universal Health Coverage (UHC). It provides a platform for stakeholders to collaborate to increase access to essential medicines, low-cost effective interventions, and screenings.

== Leadership ==
The President of IFPMA is Dr Thomas Schinecker, CEO, Roche Group. Robert M. Davis, Chairman and CEO of Merck & Co., and Hiroyuki Okuzawa, President and CEO, Daiichi Sankyo, serve as Vice-Presidents.

== See also ==
- Association of the British Pharmaceutical Industry
- European Federation of Pharmaceutical Industries and Associations Europe
- Interpharma Switzerland
- Innovative Pharmaceutical Association South Africa
- The Japan Pharmaceutical Manufacturers Association
- Les entreprises du médicament France
