= Evan Morris (writer) =

American language columnist and writer

Evan Morris (4 December 1949 – 8 October 2017) was an American writer and nationally syndicated language columnist best known for The Word Detective, a newspaper column and website devoted to English word origins, etymology, and language usage. He also wrote several books on language, word history, books, and the Internet.

== Life ==
Evan Morris was born on December 4, 1949 in Princeton, New Jersey and grew up in Greenwich, Connecticut. He studied at Ohio State University and worked as a freelance writer and photographer after graduation.

His mother was Mary Elizabeth Davis Morris, his father William Morris (1914–1994) was a lexicographer and publishing executive who worked as editor-in-chief for publishing house Grosset & Dunlap and the American Heritage Dictionary. William and Mary Morris co-authored a number of books about words and language, and wrote a syndicated newspaper column titled Words, Wit and Wisdom, which Evan later co-wrote together with his father. After his father's death in 1994, Evan continued writing the column on his own, renaming it The Word Detective.

The Word Detective column was published in multiple US newspapers, and in two English-language newspapers in other countries: The News of Mexico City and The Japan Times. In 1995, Morris started the Word Detective website and e-mail newsletter, where he would re-publish his columns a few months after their publication in newspapers. In 2000, he released an eponymous book containing collected material from the column. Morris also wrote several other books, as well as feature articles, book reviews, and humorous essays for several newspapers and magazines.

At the time of his father's death in 1994, Morris was living in Manhattan with his wife and author, Kathy Wollard. He and his wife relocated to Millersport, Ohio in 1998. Evan Morris died on 8 October 2017, aged 67, following a two-year struggle with cancer.

== Bibliography ==
- The Book Lover's Guide to the Internet (1996) was written as a nontechnical guide for readers, writers, and book enthusiasts using the emerging Internet.
- The Word Detective (2000) collected material from Morris's syndicated question-and-answer column about words and expressions.
- Making Whoopee (2004) focused on the vocabulary of love, courtship, romance, and sexuality.
- From Altoids to Zima (2004) examined the histories behind 125 commercial brand names. Its subjects included products in categories such as food and drink, clothing, technology and toys, automobiles, drugs, and cosmetics. Morris also examined trademarks that became generic terms, unusual or unsuccessful product names, brand-related urban legends, and the business of creating new corporate and product names.
- Apocalypse Noun: Grammar Grumps, Comma Cops, and the Greatly Exaggerated Death of the English Language (2009) challenged contemporary claims that changes in grammar, punctuation, and usage represented a deterioration of the English language.
