= Center for Demographic Genetics of Academy of Sciences and Arts of Bosnia and Herzegovina =

Bosnian research organization

Center for Demographic Genetics ANUB&H
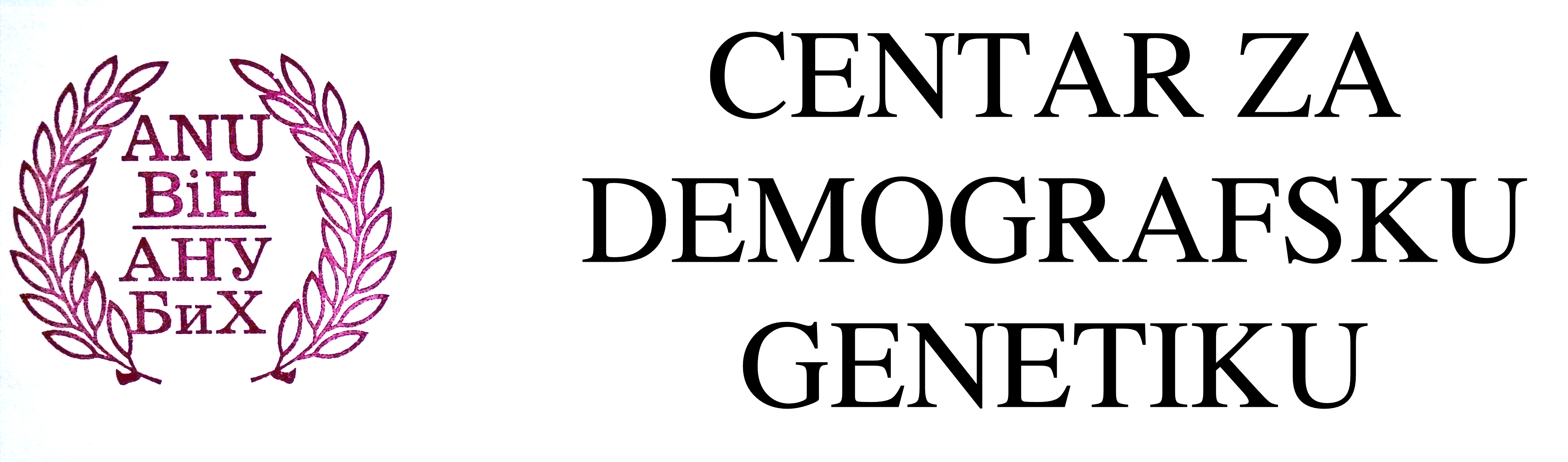
- Abbreviation: CDG – ANUBiH
- Formation: July 15, 2020
- Type: Public scientific institution
- Purpose: Research, Education
- Headquarters: Sarajevo
- Location: Bosnia and Herzegovina
- Director: Academician Rifat Hadžiselimović, PhD
- Secretary: Dina Masnik – Abdurahim Kalajdžić
- Staff: 31 (February, 2022)
- Volunteers: Unlimited
- Website: Official website

The Center for Demographic Genetics of the Academy of Sciences and Arts of Bosnia and Herzegovina (abbreviated CDG-ANUBiH), was established on July 15, 2020 at the formal proposal of the Department of Natural and Mathematical Sciences, which was represented by a wider circle of interested institutions and individuals in the field of natural and social sciences.

== Basics and activities ==
After the successful realization of the first strategic goal of ANUBiH in the development of genetic and biotechnological research in Bosnia and Herzegovina, that is the macroproject of Social Goal VI (working title: "Genetic Engineering and Biotechnology"), including appropriate human and infrastructural support, ANUBiH initiates institutionalization of population genetic research. Such a need is based on the results of already established research on the genetics of the population of Bosnia and Herzegovina, as well as the fact that B&H geneticists in this field are already widely established as leaders in the Region, both in scope and in the quality and diversity of approaches to local demographic genetics.

Thanks to mostly individual, and less often organized institutional research, the genetic structure of B&H local populations are better known than the population of other countries in the Region. This equally applies to knowledge of the genetic structure of representative metapopulation samples. In Bosnia and Herzegovina, possible factors of genetic differentiation of local parts of the population have been investigated, and B&H researchers also collaborated on demographic and genetic research in today's neighboring countries: MontenegroCroatia, Slovenia and Serbia, including Kosovo and Vojvodina.

Demographic and genetic research of the appropriate population structure in Bosnia and Herzegovina have a relatively long history, based on the work of Austrian military doctors (Augustin Weisbach, Heinrich Himmel and their associates), who led meticulous Austro-Hungarian recruitment commissions throughout Bosnia and Herzegovina, and after that published their research in the famous journal Mitteilungen der Anthropologischen Gesellschaft in Wien (MAGW). This is followed by a long period, in which sporadic data on the frequency of blood groups of several antigenic systems appear. Research momentum in this area began in the late 1960s, from information on the phenogenotype structure of our population by individual traits and their complexes, through the study of genetic distance and similarity of local populations, given selected morphological, biochemical and physiological hereditary traits, to complex molecular genetic research in recent epoch.

The concept of the newly established center is based on an interdisciplinary and polyvalent approach, which includes population genetics, biological anthropology, linguistics, medicine, archaeology, ethnology, history, physical culture, sports and related scientific fields. The primary intention of the newly formed Center is to integrate human and infrastructural potentials in researching the genetic characteristics of the population of Bosnia and Herzegovina, from the ancient, medieval and recent eras, to predict their changes in space and time.

== Main directions and goals of action ==
Integration of appropriate human and infrastructural potentials in the related field;

- Establishment of a database on genetic characteristics of the population of B&H;
- DNA analysis and characterization of ancient, medieval and recent samples;
- Analysis of past and prediction of possible changes in the genetic composition of the population.

== Basic work units / research teams ==
Areas

- Population genetics
- Demography – Ethnology
- Biostatistics – Bioinformatics

== Researchers and collaborators ==
Academic

- Sreten Govedarica,
- Rifat Hadžiselimović,
- Senahid Halilović,
- Dina Masnik and
- Sabina Vejzagić.

External

- Adisa Ahmić, UNTZ
- Kasim Bajrović, INGEB, UNSA
- Edin Bujak, Faculty of Philosophy, UNSA
- Adnan Busuladžić, Faculty of Philosophy, UNSA
- Nedim Čović, Faculty of Sports and Physical Education, UNSA
- Mirela Džehverović, INGEB, UNSA
- Jasmina Hindija Čakar, INGEB, UNSA
- Jasminka H. Halilović, University of Brčko District
- Abdurahim Kalajdžić, INGEB, UNSA
- Samim Konjicija, Faculty of Electrical Engineering, UNSA
- Lejla Lasić, INGEB, UNSA
- Damir Marjanović, Burch University
- Aida Pilav, Cantonal Institute of Public Health
- Amela Pilav, INGEB, UNSA
- Lejla Pojskić, INGEB, UNSA
- Naris Pojskić, INGEB, UNSA
- Pavao Rudan, HAZU, Zagreb
- Aida Sarač Hadžihalilović, Faculty of Medicine, UNSA
- Muriz Spahić, Faculty of Sciences, UNSA.
- Senad Šljuka, Faculty of Science, UNSA
- Gazmend Temaj, European University, Pristina
- Nexhibe Nuhii, Professor (Assistant) at State University of Tetova
- Maruška Vidovič, National Institute of Public Health (NIJZ), Ljubljana

== Additional images ==
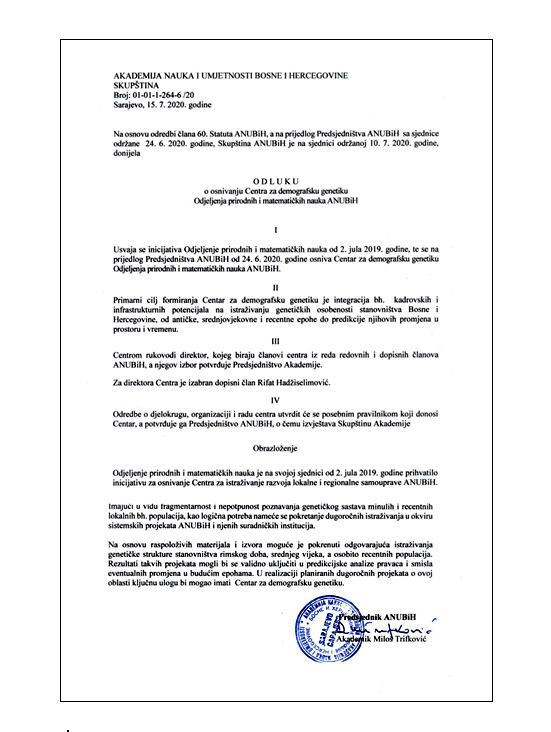
Founding document of the Center

== See also ==
- Academy of Sciences and Arts of Bosnia and Herzegovina
- University of Sarajevo
