= Dejan Milošević =

Dejan Milošević (born in Sarajevo, Bosnia and Herzegovina) is a Bosnian theoretical physicist and a professor of theoretical physics since 1999 at the University of Sarajevo. His main areas of research are atomic processes in strong laser fields and attophysics.

Milošević received his high school education in Sarajevo, as well as bachelor's degree in 1981 from University of Sarajevo. He completed his master's degree and PhD from the University of Belgrade in 1990. In 1991 he became assistant professor of Lasers and Infrared Technology at University of Sarajevo Faculty of Mechanical Engineering (Department of Precise Mechanics and Optics). He was an Alexander von Humboldt Fellow and is a member of European Academy of Sciences and Arts.

He is the founder of SAMOPHYS, a research group focused on theoretical physics.
