= Melina Borčak =

Bosnian-German journalist and author

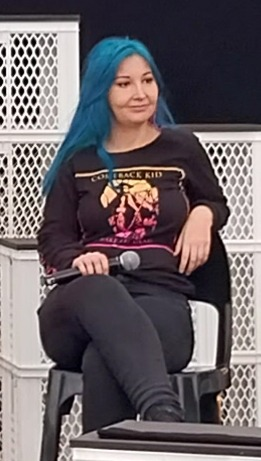
- At the Reeperbahn Festival in 2023
- Born: 1990 (age 35–36); Sarajevo, Yugoslavia
- Education: University of Sarajevo; Humboldt University of Berlin
- Occupations: Journalist, filmmaker

Melina Borčak (born 1990) is a Bosnian-German journalist, author, and filmmaker. She works on topics such as anti-Muslim racism, media criticism, Muslim feminism, and anti-discrimination. She has lived in Germany again since 2015, after spending nearly two decades in Bosnia. Her journalistic contributions have appeared in international media outlets such as CNN, ARD, Arte and Deutsche Welle.

== Life ==
=== Childhood and youth ===
Melina Borčak was born in Sarajevo and grew up as a refugee in Germany during the Bosnian War (1992–1995). After the war, she and her family were given the choice of leaving Germany voluntarily or being deported at their own expense, which is why she returned to Bosnia, where she spent her youth in Sarajevo during the post-war years. Her experiences as a refugee and returning to an unknown country shaped her later work.

=== Training ===
She studied journalism at the University of Sarajevo and later completed a master's degree in media studies at the Humboldt University of Berlin. During her studies, she held scholarships from several organizations, including the Heinrich Böll Foundation, the Konrad Adenauer Foundation, the Deutschlandstiftung Integration (under the patronage of Angela Merkel), the City of Sarajevo, and the Ikre Foundation for Children of Genocidally Murdered Parents and Demobilized Soldiers.

=== Career start ===
After completing her studies, she initially worked in Bosnian media before moving her career to Germany. She held positions at Deutsche Welle in Bonn, Berlin, and Potsdam, the EMS School of Journalism, and the German Bundestag. Since returning to Germany in 2015, she has worked as a freelance journalist and filmmaker.

== Professional activities ==
=== Journalism and film ===
Melina Borčak works as a freelance journalist for media outlets such as CNN, ARD, Arte , and Deutsche Welle. Her focus is on topics such as racism, genocide, media criticism, and Muslim feminism. She is considered a recognized expert on the Srebrenica genocide. In July 2025, Borčak published a guide to reporting on the Srebrenica genocide on behalf of the Srebrenica Memorial Center.

In 2022, Borčak criticized a podcast episode of the program "Sack Reis." She accused the SWR of genocide denial. The SWR reacted to Borčak being invited to a special episode of the podcast. The editor-in-chief of the magazine "Journalist," Matthias Daniel, described the special broadcast as "devastating." As a result, the SWR podcast format was temporarily discontinued. Later, the SWR deleted both the criticized podcast episode and the special episode, whereupon Borčak uploaded the special episode to Twitter, making it available again. The Society for Threatened Peoples wrote an open letter to SWR editor-in-chief Karin Feltes. It states: "We urge you to remove the podcast episode 'Sack Reis' with Milica from all distribution channels. A correction of the false facts and an apology to the survivors and those affected by this from SWR is urgently overdue."

=== Literature ===
In 2023, she published the book Mekka hier, Mekka da – Wie wir über antimuslimischen Rassismus sprechen müssen. The book addresses anti-Muslim racism in Germany and analyzes the portrayal of Muslims in the media, politics, and everyday life. The book was a Der Spiegel bestseller and was also received in Borčak's homeland, Bosnia.

== Publications ==
=== Films ===
- Melina Borčak: Vergessene Frauen – Vertrags- und Gastarbeiterinnen heute. In: RBB , March 21, 2020
- Melina Borčak (Reporter): Die Kinder des Bosnienkrieges – 23 Jahre später. In: Funk , 2019

=== Articles and essays ===
- Melina Borčak: Keine Strafe hoch genug. In: Spiegel Online , 2017
- Melina Borčak: Das weiße Band der Schande. ( Spiegel Online) , 2017
- Melina Borčak: Leise rieseln die Privilegien. (TAZ), 2020
- Melina Borčak, Alice Hasters: Einwanderungsdeutschland: 1945 bis 2023 (Bundeszentrale für politische Bildung, 2020) (pp. 258–341)
- Melina Borčak: Die Vergangenheit ist nie vergangen. (TAZ, 2021)
- Emilia, Alexandra Zykunov, Silvie Horch (eds.): Unlearn Patricarchy 2. 2024. (pp. 214–238, portal.dnb.de)

=== Books ===
- Borčak, Melina: Mekka hier, Mekka da. Wie wir über antimuslimischen Rassismus sprechen müssen. 2023 (hanserblau)
