= Rifat Hadžiselimović =

Bosnian geneticist

- Born: 7 January 1944 (age 82)
- Education: PhD of Biological Sciences, Faculty of Science, University of Sarajevo, 1977

Rifat Hadžiselimović is a Bosnian geneticist. He was born in Šiprage, Bosnia and Herzegovina on 7 January 1944. In 2013, with over 45 years of service, he was appointed Emeritus. He acts as scientific adviser in Institute for Genetic Engineering and Biotechnology, University of Sarajevo.

Rifat Hadžiselimović is the member of Academy of Sciences and Arts of Bosnia and Herzegovina since 2018.

== Education and Professional Career ==
Rifat Hadžiselimović completed secondary education in Banja Luka after which in 1962 he enrolled at the Faculty of Natural Sciences and Mathematics in Sarajevo. He graduated as a Biology teacher in 1966 and completed his master's degree in Biology (Anthropology) in 1971 at the Faculty of Science and Mathematics, University of Zagreb, Croatia. His Master thesis was entitled "Historical aspect of the change of relative frequency of two allelogens in human populations". He completed his PhD in biology in 1976 at the Faculty of Science, University of Sarajevo on the subject of "The Genetics of ABH antigens secretion in the population of Bosnia and Herzegovina".

Since 1966 he has been employed by the Faculty of Science, University of Sarajevo, first as an Assistant Lecturer (1966-1977), then as an Assistant Professor (1977), Associate Professor (1980) and the Professor (1984) on subjects: Human Genetics, Genetic Engineering and Biotechnology, Molecular Biology, Evolution, Bioanthropology, and Biomedicine.

He was as an active member of the Anthropological Society of Yugoslavia and was a co-founder and member of the Association of Genetics in Bosnia and Herzegovina. From 1984 – 1986 he also served as the Head of the Department of Biology. From 1994 - 2003 he was engaged in the development of the "Postgraduate study of biological sciences" where he was the head of the programme, and from 2007 was the head of the as the "Genetics" field of the programme.

In the period from 1987 to 2001, he was the Director of the Institute of Genetic Engineering and Biotechnology (INGEB), and from 2001 he was the Project Coordinator of the DNA Project which was developed in cooperation with the International Commission on Missing Persons (ICMP). He was also engaged as the Scientific Advisor of the institute (INGEB), and from 2006 to 2012 was appointed a chair of the Board of Directors of the institute.
