= Institute for Genetic Engineering and Biotechnology =

Bosnian public research institute

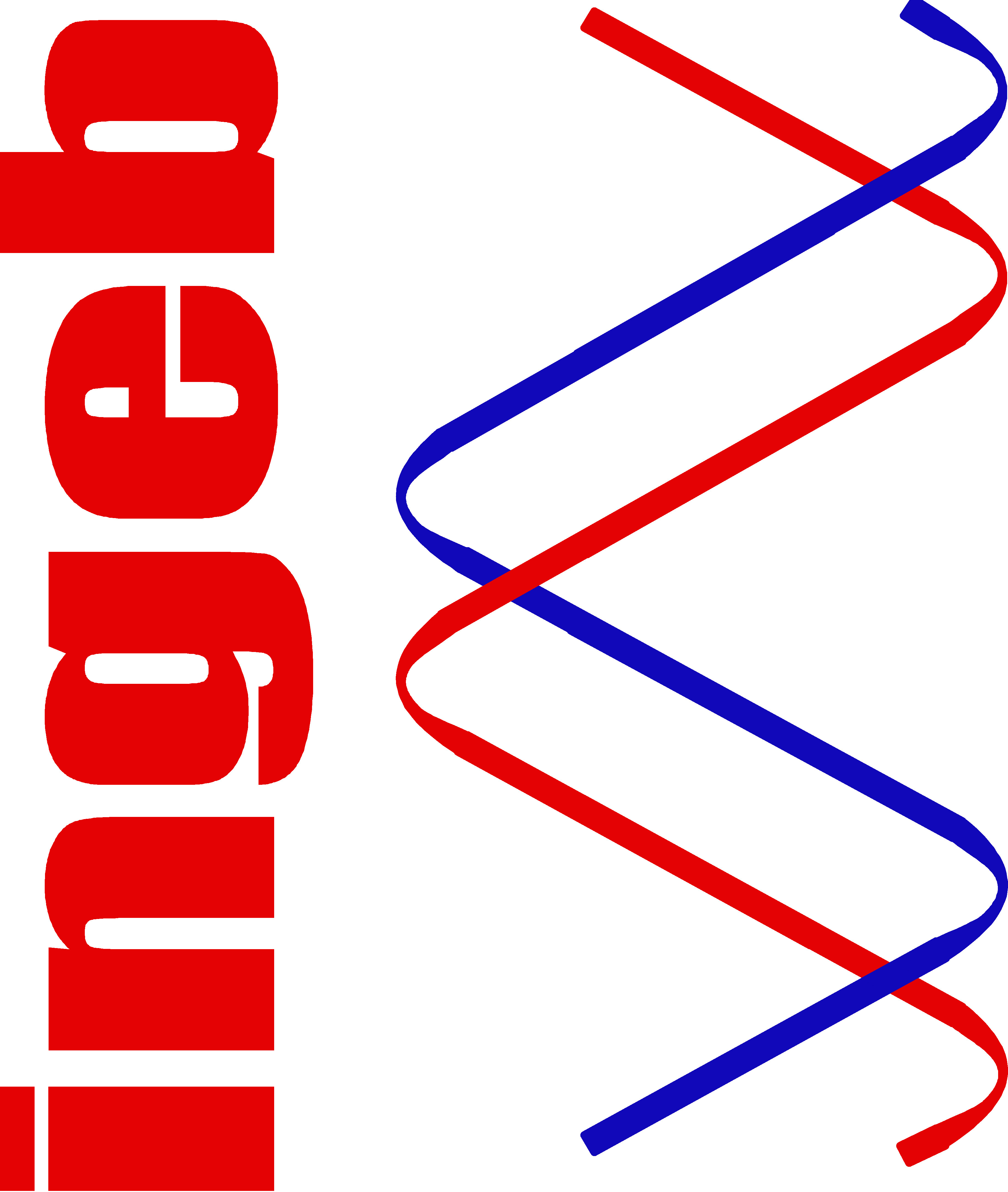
- Abbreviation: INGEB
- Predecessor: Centre for Genetic Engineering and Biotechnology
- Formation: February 28, 1988
- Type: Public scientific institution
- Purpose: Research, Education
- Headquarters: Sarajevo
- Location: Bosnia and Herzegovina
- Director: Naris Pojskić, PhD
- Staff: 30 (as of February 2022)
- Website: Official website
- Formerly called: Centre for Genetic Engineering and Biotechnology

Institute for Genetic Engineering and Biotechnology (INGEB) is a Bosnian public research institute, member of Sarajevo University (UNSA), and affiliate center of International Centre for Genetic Engineering and Biotechnology (ICGEB).

ICGEB was established as a special project of the United Nations Industrial Development Organization (UNIDO).

INGEB was founded under the name "Center for Genetic Engineering and Biotechnology", in 1988. INGEB's headquarters are located in Sarajevo.

One of INGEB's most prominent founders was Professor Rifat Hadžiselimović, with the support of the Government of Socialist Republic of Bosnia and Herzegovina, ANUBiH and the biggest B&H economic systems. After the establishment document, INGEB was entrusted with the functions maker, institutional creator and carrier of the overall scientific and professional work in the development of genetic engineering and biotechnology based molecular biology in B&H.

In 1993, by a legal act, the Assembly of Republic of Bosnia and Herzegovina, assumed the right of the founder of the institution, at the beginning of the Bosnian War, and later, in 1999, entitled founder of INGEB (as a "public institution that will operate within the University of Sarajevo") took over the Sarajevo Canton.

== Structure and activities ==
In INGEB, there are following functional units:

- Laboratory for forensic genetics;
- Laboratory for human genetics;
- Laboratory for GMO and food biosafety;
- Laboratory for molecular genetics of natural resources;
- Laboratory for bioinformatics and biostatistics, and
- Laboratory for cytogenetics and genotoxicology.

=== Laboratory for Forensic Genetics ===
Laboratory for forensic genetics provides scientific approach to analysis of samples of different origin. In this laboratory DNA profiling is routinely done for skeletal remains, blood stains (on different materials), hair, semen, controversial traces on cigarette butts, controversial traces under fingernails, in urine etc.

Expert activities perform in laboratory for forensic genetics include:

- paternity testing using samples of buccal swab (which reduces traumatic effect on children), blood, hair, bones and other baseline samples.
- motherless paternity testing,
- maternity testing without the presence of the father,
- biological kinship testing,
- forensic DNA analysis for police, prosecution, law offices, courts and private individual purposes.

In laboratory for forensic genetics scientific projects, supported by the respective ministries and foreign institutions, are implemented or are under realization. The focus of scientific research is directed towards genetic analysis of archaeological skeletal samples, forensic genetic parameters testing of Bosnian population, as well as towards a target oriented expansion of previously initiated population genetic research.

=== Laboratory for Human Genetics ===
This laboratory represents the organizational segment of the Institute which is dealing with genetic characterisation of DNA of human origin for the purpose of basic and applied research. We use molecular-genetics approach mainly PCR based in investigating the genetic structure.

Main activities of the laboratory comprise research directions:

- detection of circulating DNA sequences as potential markers in molecular oncology,
- gene expression profiling for characterization of therapeutical effects of novel and biological substances and individual genetic predisposition to complex traits (disorders).

Other important aspect is participation in higher education programs at University of Sarajevo as well as public engagement in developing molecular-genetics methods for support of medical diagnostics.

=== Laboratory for GMO and Food Biosafety ===
The laboratory scope includes wide array of activities mainly focused on the issues of food biosafety and plant biotechnology. It provides qualitative and quantitative analysis of specific DNA sequences in various food matrices, provides advice and correct interpretation of GMO related data to consumers and food safety authority and promotes science based approach to biosafety. In that respect the Laboratory has established communication with JRC-EURL-GMFF and follows the published guidelines. Also, the Laboratory develops new analytical methods, where appropriate, to bridge the gaps in the available methodology.

Research aspect of the Laboratory is mainly focused on endemic and endangered plant species with bioactive potential. Simultaneously with bioactive potential of a species, which is explored in in vitro and in vivo models, molecular markers are employed to evaluate its genetic diversity for the purpose of conservation.

=== Laboratory for Cytogenetics and Genotoxicology ===
Research activities of the Laboratory for Cytogenetics and Genotoxicology are based on:

- Cytogenetic and genotoxicological analysis of bioactive potential of certain physical, chemical and biological agents, and
- Cytogenetic and genotoxicological monitoring of human populations in Bosnia and Herzegovina.

Expert activity of the Laboratory for Cytogenetics and Genotoxicology mainly includes chromosome analysis and karyotyping of human samples. The most frequently used tests in research projects of this lab are based on cell culture and include: chromosome aberrations analysis, cytokinesis-block micronucleus cytome assay and sister chromatids exchange assay. Evaluation of cytotoxic and cytostatic potential of various chemical agents includes application of colorimetric method in different cell lines. Research capacities are significantly used for academic education and the realization of final thesis of Sarajevo University students.

Expertises:

- Karyotype analysis;
- Cytogenetic biodosimetry;
- In vitro testing of genotoxic and cytotoxic potential of chemical substances and herbal extracts using:
  - Chromosome aberrations analysis;
  - Cytokinesis-block micronucleus cytome assay;
  - Sister-chromatid exchange assay;
  - Allium assay;
  - Alamar blue assay;
  - Trypan blue assay.
- Primary cell lines establishment.

Projects:

- Analysis of K2(B3O3F4OH) bioactive and medical potential; (ongoing project).
- Analysis of natural bioactive compounds potential in the inhibition of genotoxic and cytotoxic effects in vitro; (2012-2013) Financed by Federal ministry of education and science.
- Cytotoxicity and genotoxicity analysis of natural and synthetic food colorants in FB&H; (2011-2012) Financed by Federal ministry of education and science.
- Evaluation of antitumor properties of halogenated boroxine; (2010-2011) Financed by Federal ministry of education and science.
- Participation in international collaborative project: HUMNXL – Exfoliated cells micronucleus project; (2009-2011);
- Analysis of the specific chromosomal markers of basal cell carcinoma; (2007-2009) Financed by the Ministry of Education and Science of Sarajevo Canton;
- Cytogenetic markers in human populations of FB&H as possible bioindicators for Balcan syndrome; (2002-2003) Financed by Federal ministry of science, culture and sport.
