= University of Sarajevo =

University in Sarajevo, Bosnia and Herzegovina

- Univerzitet u Sarajevu; Sveučilište u Sarajevu; Универзитет у Сарајеву
- Type: Public
- Established: 2 December 1949; 76 years ago
- Affiliations: European University Association
- Endowment: $247.9 million (2020)
- Budget: $107.8 million (2020)
- Rector: Prof. dr. Tarik Zaimović
- Faculty: 1,636
- Administrative staff: 990
- Students: 23,127 (2021)
- Location: Sarajevo, Bosnia and Herzegovina; 43°52′N 18°25′E
- Campus: Urban
Colors
Blue and white
- Website: www.unsa.ba (in Bosnian and English)

University rankings

Regional – Overall
- QS Emerging Europe and Central Asia: 162 (2022)

The University of Sarajevo (Bosnian: Univerzitet u Sarajevu; Croatian: Sveučilište u Sarajevu; Serbian: Универзитет у Сарајеву) is a public university located in Sarajevo, Bosnia and Herzegovina.

With 20 faculties, three academies and three faculties of theology and with 23,127 enrolled students as of 2021, it ranks among the largest universities in the Balkans in terms of enrollment. Since opening its doors in 1949, a total of 122,000 students have received bachelor's degrees, 3,891 have received master's degrees and 2,284 have received doctorate degrees in 45 different fields. It is now widely regarded as the most prestigious university in Bosnia and Herzegovina, and employs more than one thousand faculty members.

== History ==
=== Ottoman period, late Medieval-early Modern ===
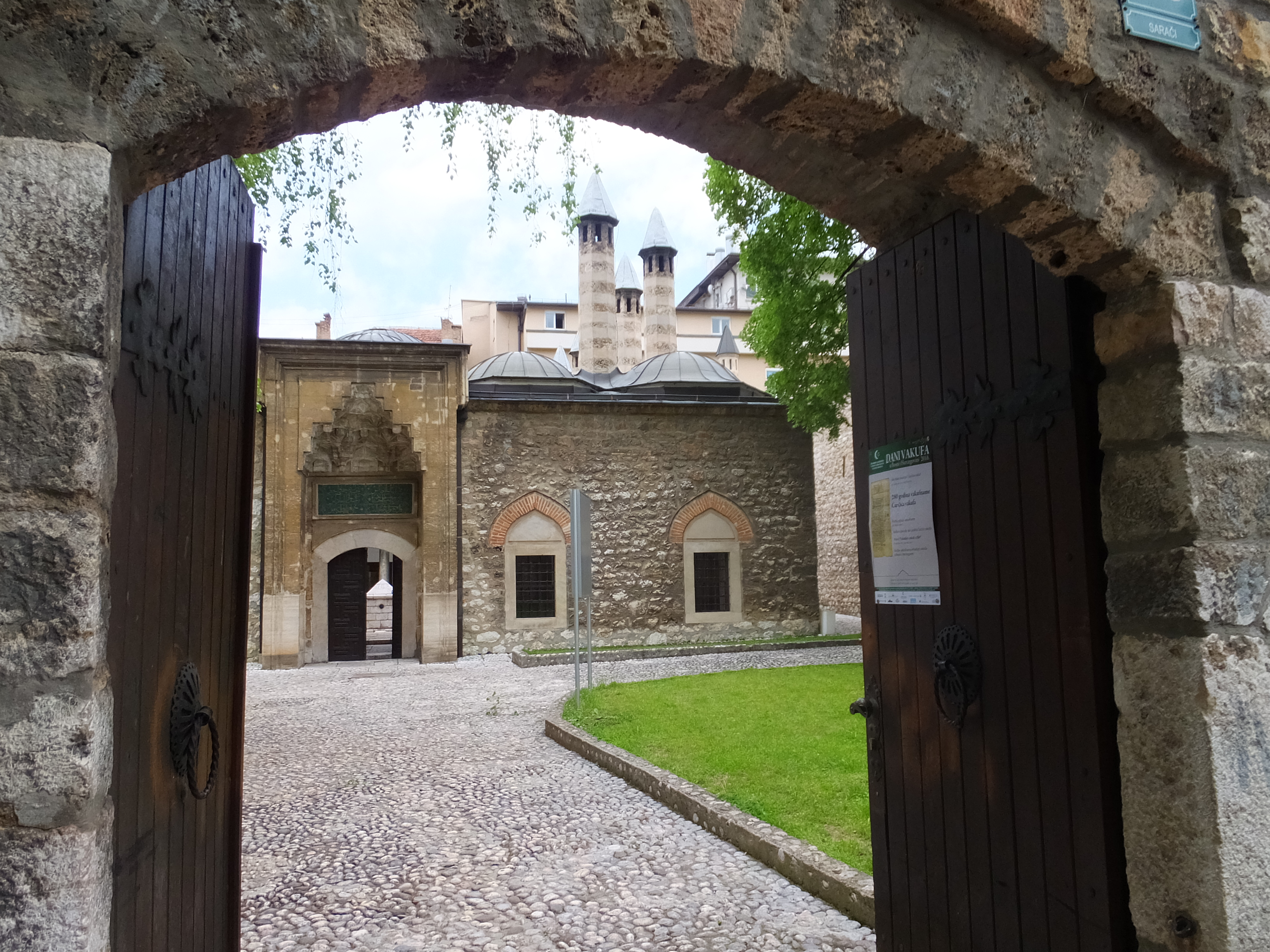
Main gate of the Gazi Husrev Bey's Library in Baščaršija, built in 1537

Before the establishment of the modern University of Sarajevo, first schools of higher educations in Sarajevo and Bosnia and Herzegovina were founded during the 16th century under tutelage of the Ottomans. It was inaugurated in Sarajevo in 1537 by Gazi Husrev Bey, as an Ottoman institute of higher education, a madrasa.

=== Austria-Hungary period and first Yugoslavia, late Modern-end of WWII ===
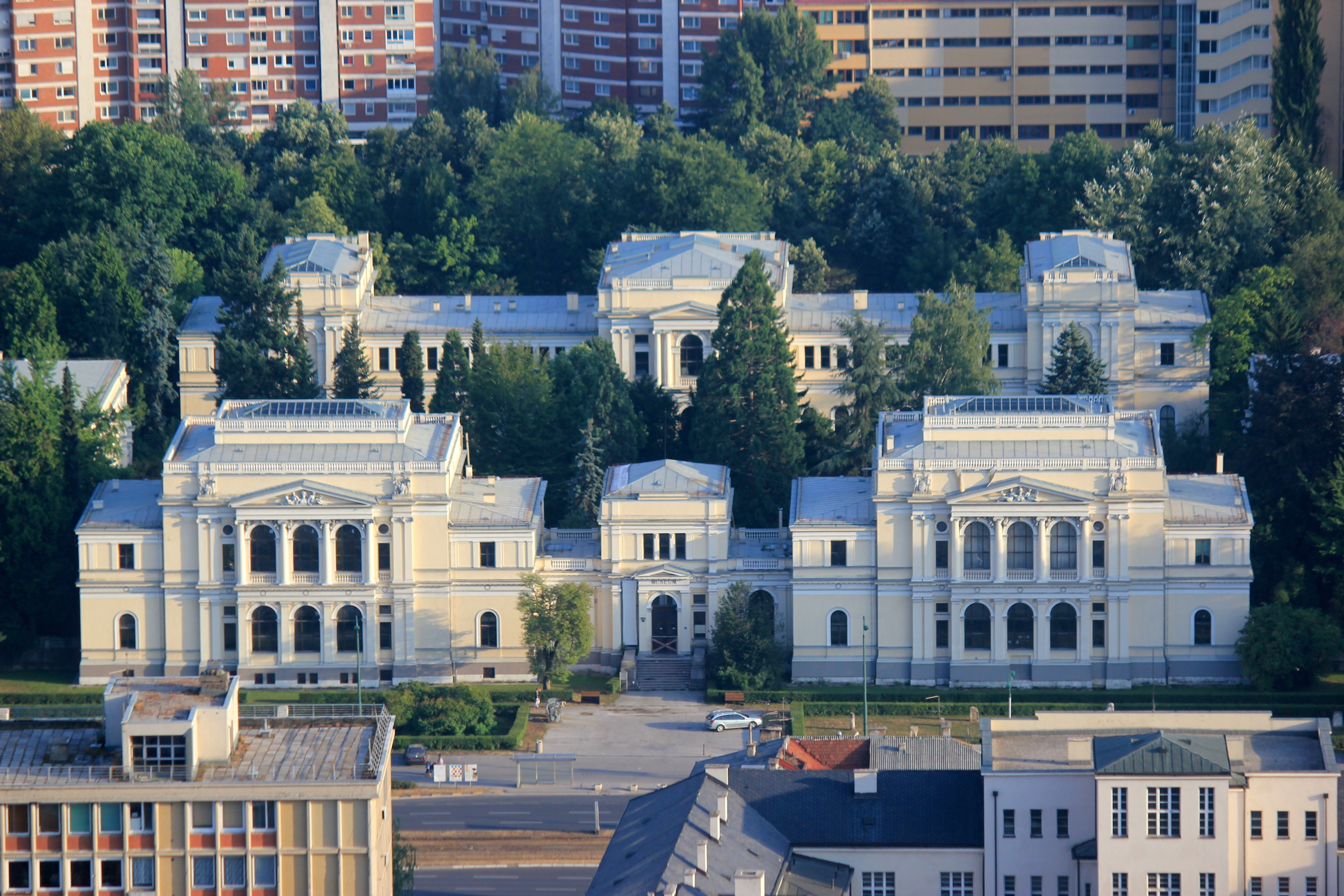
The National Museum of Bosnia and Herzegovina, built in the Austro-Hungarian period

The university in its modern, secular incarnation was developed during the Austro-Hungarian rule, when many of the institutions of higher education and culture such as the National Museum of Bosnia and Herzegovina, still active today, were established. The modern history of the University of Sarajevo continued after World War I, and before World War II as well as during the war, successfully widening its development with new schools and institutes, such as the Faculty of Agriculture and Forestry in 1940 and the Medical Faculty in 1944. The Medical Faculty was re-established in 1946, while the Faculty of Law, the Teacher Training College were opened and, in 1948, the Faculty of Agriculture and Forestry was re-established.

=== Establishment and post WWII development ===
==== 1949–1955 ====
In 1949, the Engineering Faculty was opened. On 2 December of that year with the appointment of the first rector, the University of Sarajevo was officially established. With the opening of the Faculty of Humanities (1950) and the Faculty of Economics (1952), the initial phase of the establishment of the Sarajevo University was completed.

==== 1955–1970 ====
The second phase of development (1955–69) was characterized by the affirmation of the university, the opening of new institutions of higher education and the relative satisfaction of the needs for highly educated personnel in Bosnia and Herzegovina. Another significant achievement is the organization and initiation of postgraduate studies at the university.

==== 1970–1982 ====
The third phase (1970–82) was defined by more institutions of higher education being opened at the university, a scientific promotion of the university and its intensified involvement and promotion on the international academic plane. The university contributed directly and indirectly to the establishment of new universities in Banja Luka, Mostar and Tuzla.

==== 1982–1992 ====
The fourth phase (1982–92) was characterized by the separation of scientific activities from the university and the formation of favored scientific institutes outside it. This brought considerable damage to the University of Sarajevo, because the coherence of university education and scientific research was endangered. This resulted in a lower quality of education and a technological stagnation of the university. The uncontrolled enrollment of an enormous number of students resulted in a significantly lower efficiency of studies and a hyper-production of personnel in certain areas of education.

==== 1992–1995 ====
The fifth phase (1992–95) was marked by devastation of the facilities and equipment of the university, caused by the Bosnian War and the siege of Sarajevo. Despite all of these difficulties of life and work during the four-year siege, because of the help and the enthusiasm, professionalism, patriotism and perseverance of university teachers and associates as well as the students, the University of Sarajevo managed to retain its continuity of work and life. This was a specific aspect of intellectual academic resistance against everything that is barbaric and uncivilized. It represented the university's contribution to the affirmation of freedom and democracy, the outcry against the war and aggression and the affirmation of the sovereignty of Bosnia and Herzegovina.

==== 1996–present ====
The University of Sarajevo entered the phase of post-war physical and academic renewal and reconstruction in 1996. The physical renewal is aimed at the reconstruction and the rebuilding of destroyed facilities (through the realization of the New University Campus Project), the replacement of destroyed educational and scientific equipment and the reconstruction of student dormitories. Significant results have been achieved on this plane and the conditions for higher quality studies have been formed in certain areas. However, despite the numerous reconstruction projects the University of Sarajevo still hasn't reached the full prewar potential. The war caused a rift even among the academics and many who worked at the university before the war didn't continue after. The quality of studies is slowly improving, partly because of the Bologna Process implementation, but there is still hyper-production in some areas of education since Bosnia and Herzegovina doesn't have a unified program of higher education.

The process of renewal and reconstruction of the university is supported by the activities of the European University Association, the European Council, the European Union as well as a whole line of international organizations and institutions involved in the field of higher education.

== Partner relations ==
The University of Sarajevo enjoys partnerships with over 120 universities in Europe, the US, Canada, and the Middle East.

== Objective ==
The main objective of all the university's current activities is to raise the quality of studies, to create a contemporary university of European origins, which will be a respectable representative of Bosnia and Herzegovina on the international level and a promoter of the traditional, historical, cultural, scientific and artistic values of the country, and Southeastern Europe.

== Organization ==
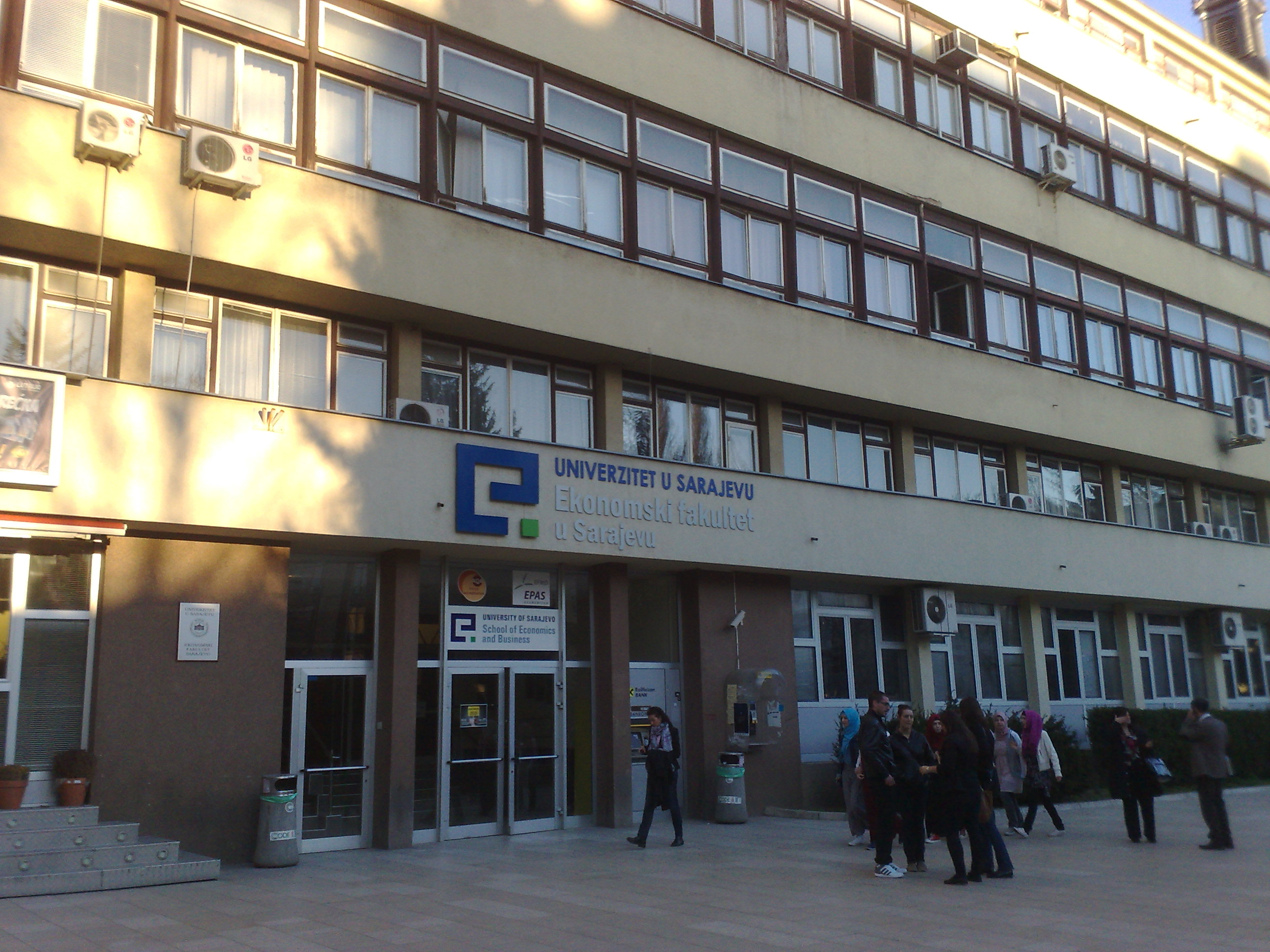
School of Economics and Business

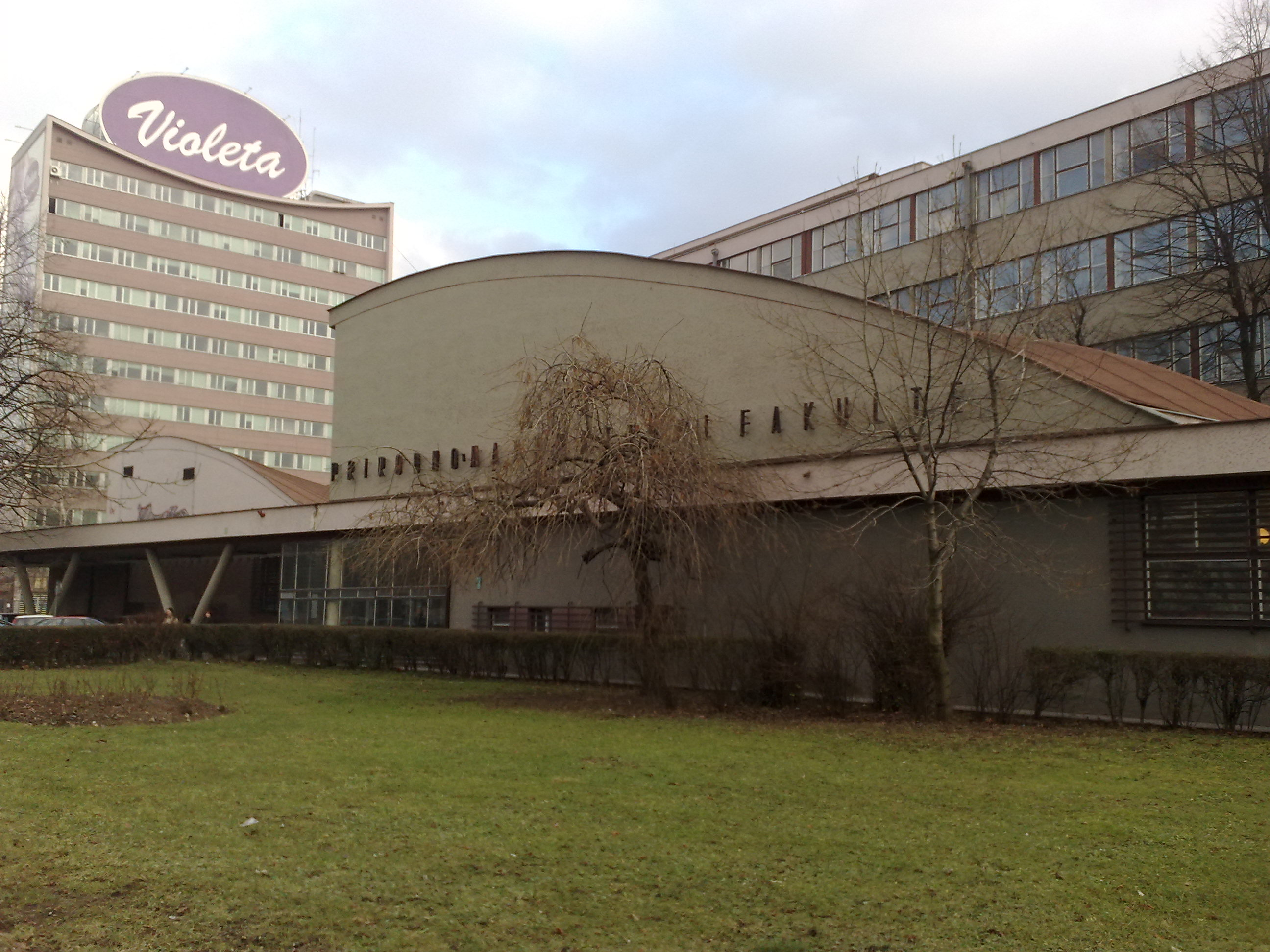
Faculty of Natural sciences and Mathematics

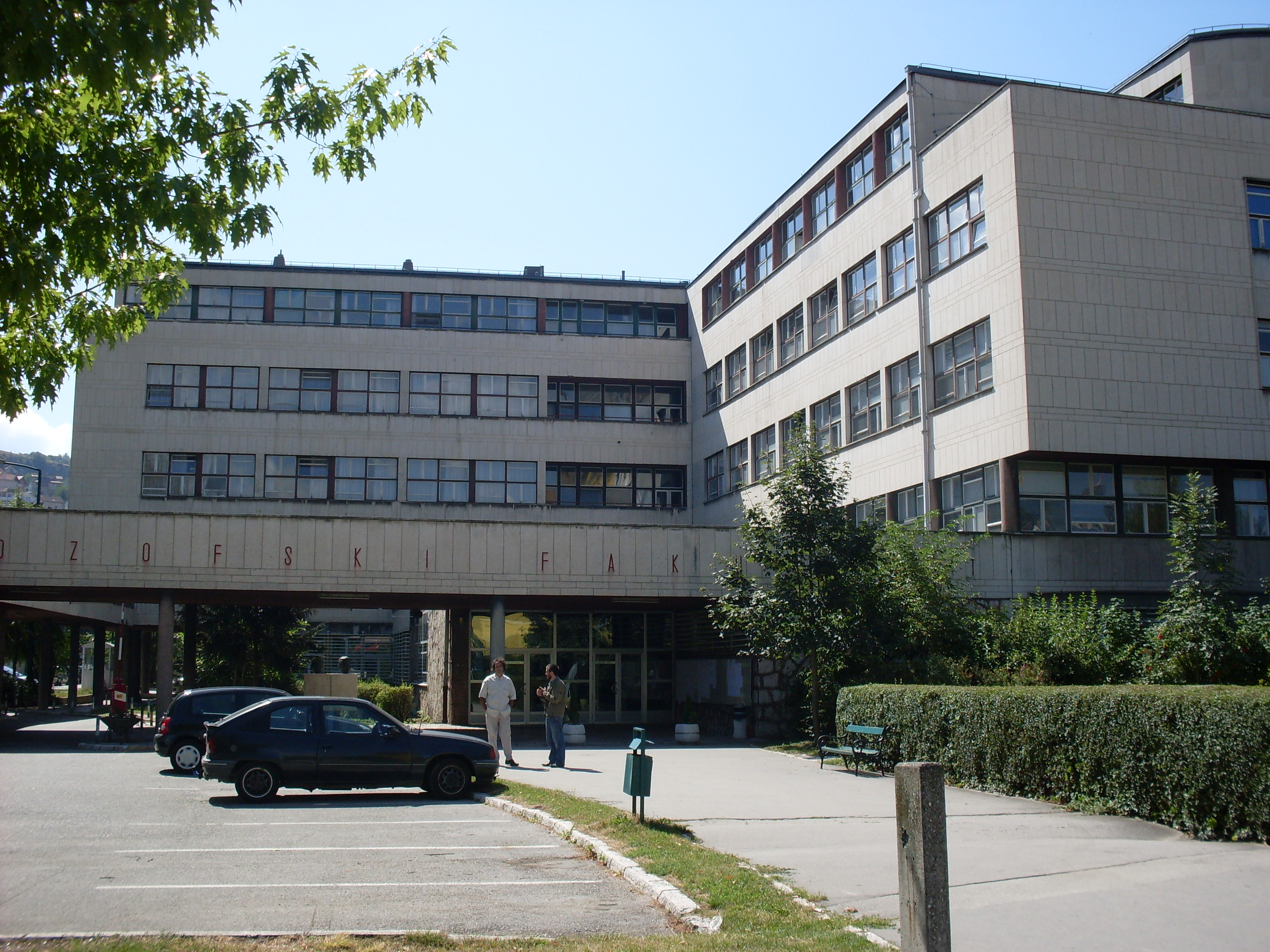
Faculty of Humanities

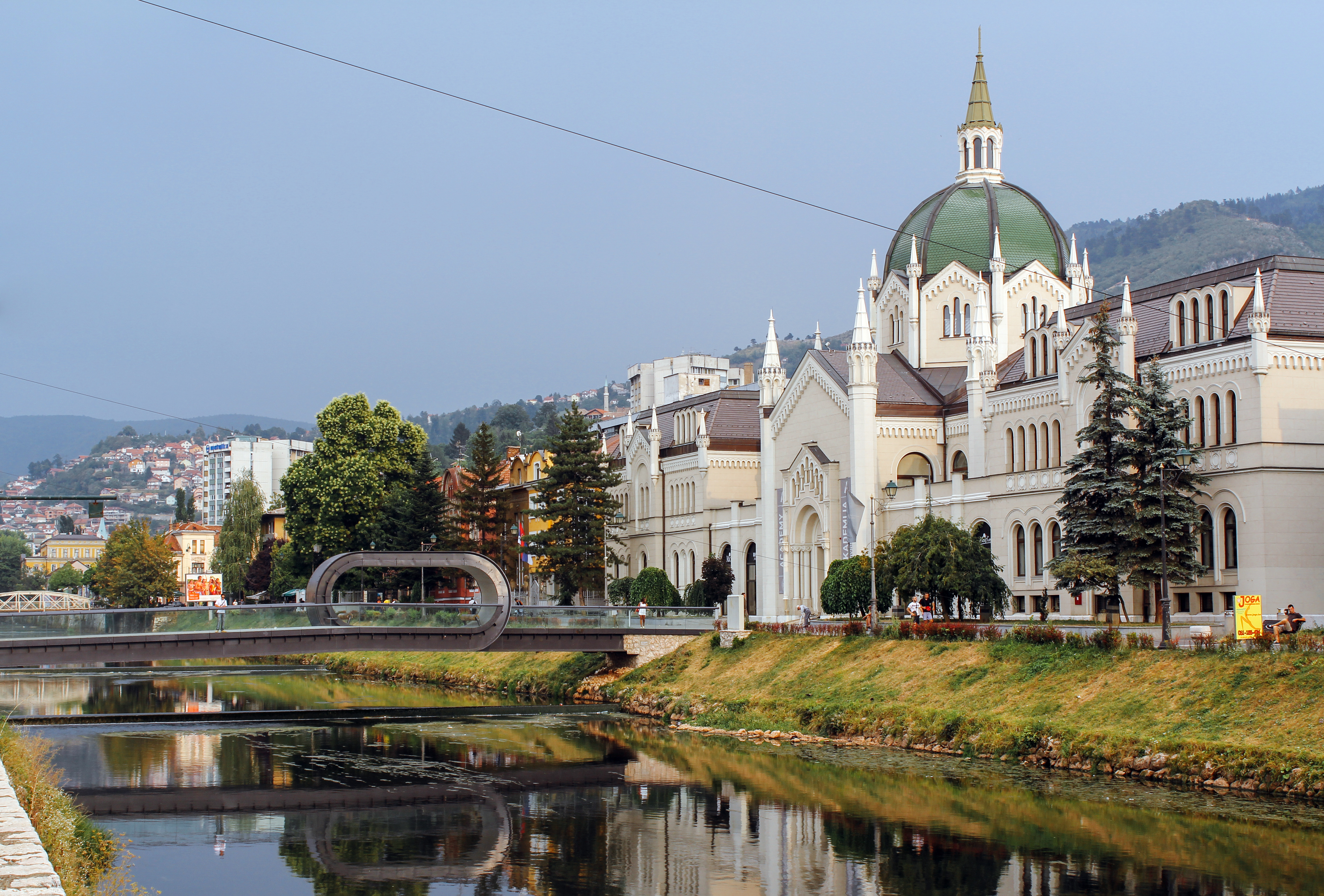
Academy of Fine Arts

The University comprises 32 faculties, academies and colleges, further subdivided into 6 academic groups, and an additional number of other programs:

=== Schools ===
- School of Economics and Business
- Academy of Fine Arts
- Academy of Performing Arts
- Faculty of Architecture
- Faculty of Electrical Engineering
- Faculty of Criminal Science
- Faculty of Political Science
- Faculty of Sport and Physical Education
- Faculty of Traffic Engineering and Communications
- Faculty of Humanities
- Faculty of Pharmacy
- Faculty of Civil engineering
- Faculty of Mechanical engineering
- Medical Faculty
- Music Academy
- College of Teacher education
- Faculty of Agriculture
- Faculty of Law
- Faculty of Science and Technology
- Faculty of Natural sciences and Mathematics
- Faculty of Dental medicine
- Faculty of Forestry
- Faculty of Veterinary medicine
- Faculty of Health Studies

=== Join Members ===
- Faculty of Islamic studies
- Faculty of Catholic Theology
- Faculty of Public Administration

=== Institutes ===
- Institute of History
- Institute for Researching Crimes against Humanity and International Law
- Institute for Genetic Engineering and Biotechnology
- Oriental Institute
- Students Center Sarajevo
- Institute for Social Research

== Rectors ==
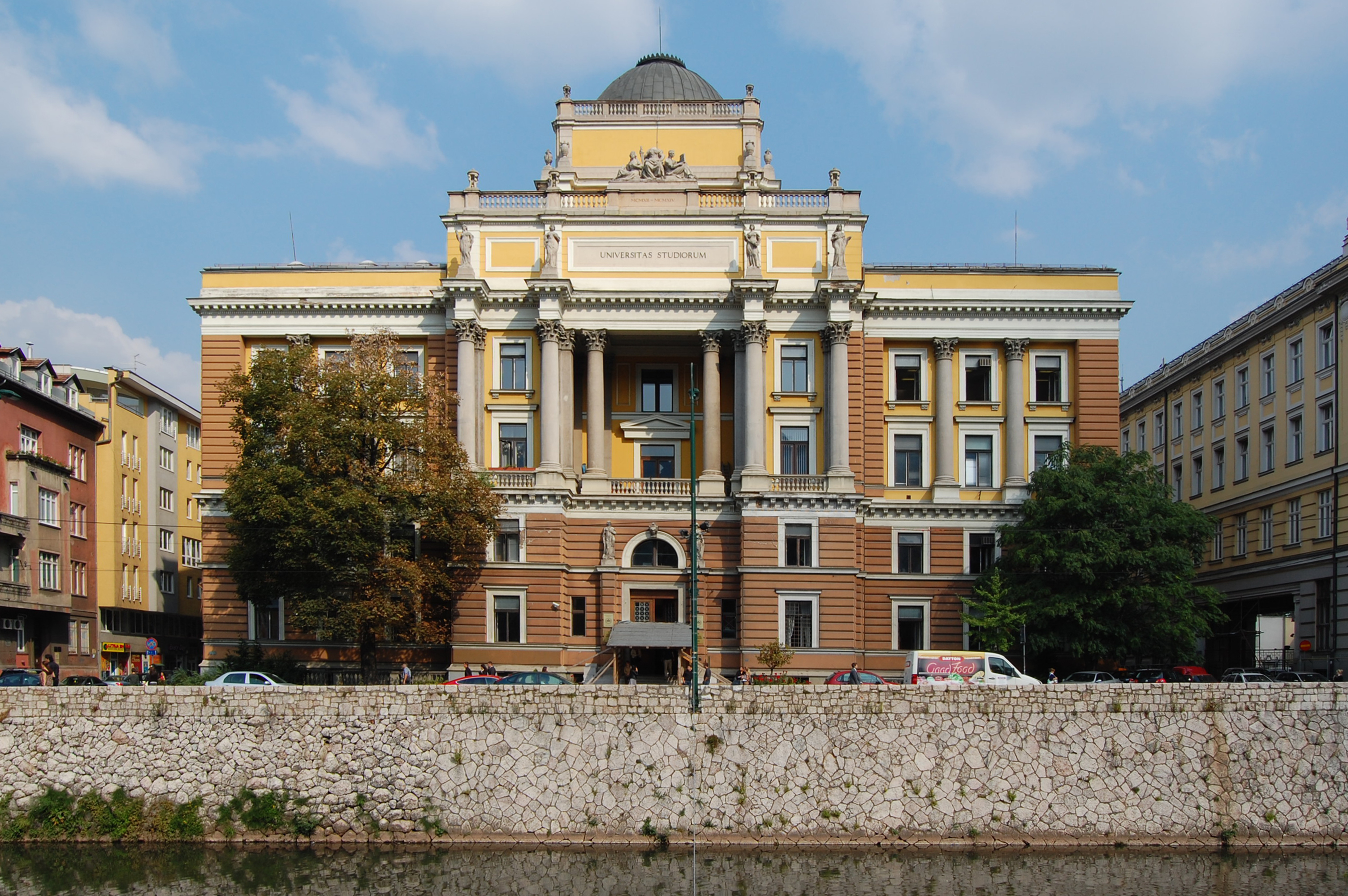
The Faculty of Law building, built in the 1850s, also serves as the university's rectorate

- Vaso Butozan (1949–1950; 1952–1956)
- Drago Krndija (1950–1952)
- Edhem Čamo (1956–1960)
- Aleksandar Trumić (1960–1965)
- Fazlija Alikalfić (1965–1969)
- Hamdija Ćemerlić (1969–1972)
- Zdravko Besarović (1972–1977)
- Arif Tanović (1977–1981)
- Božidar Matić (1981–1985)
- Ljubomir Berberović (1985–1988)
- Nenad Kecmanović (1988–1991)
- Jusuf Mulić (1991–1993)
- Faruk Selesković (1993–1995)
- Nedžad Mulabegović (1995–2000)
- Boris Tihi (2000–2004)
- Hasan Muratović (2004–2006)
- Faruk Čaklovica (2006–2012)
- Muharem Avdispahić (2012–2016)
- Rifat Škrijelj (2016–2024)
- Tarik Zaimović (2024–present)

== Notable people ==
=== Alumni ===
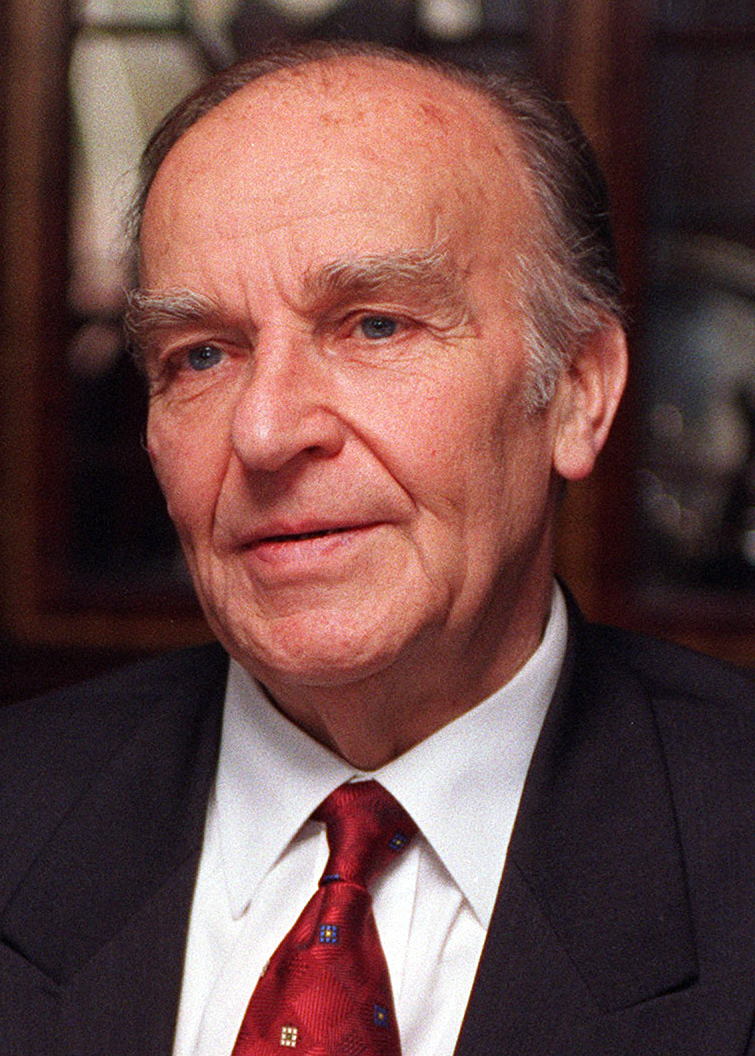
Alija Izetbegović

- Abdulah Nakaš, physician and chief surgeon of Sarajevo's State Hospital for 30 years
- Adela Jušić, Bosnian contemporary visual artist
- Ademir Kenović, Bosnian movie director, producer and cinematography professor
- Aleksandar Hemon, Bosnian writer
- Alija Behmen, former mayor of Sarajevo
- Alija Izetbegović, first Chairman of the Presidency of Bosnia and Herzegovina
- Bakir Izetbegović, former member of the Presidency of Bosnia and Herzegovina
- Benjamin Djulbegovic, medical academic and expert in evidence-based medicine
- Benjamina Karić, current mayor of Sarajevo
- Beriz Belkić, former member of the Presidency of Bosnia and Herzegovina
- Bisera Turković, former foreign minister of Bosnia and Herzegovina
- Boris Nemšić, former chief executive officer of the Russian telecom company VimpelCom, former chief executive officer of Telekom Austria Group
- Božidar Matić, former chairman of the Council of Ministers of Bosnia and Herzegovina
- Branko Đurić, Bosnian actor and musician
- Davor Sučić, Bosnian musician
- Dejan Milošević, Bosnian theoretical physicist
- Denis Bećirović, member of the Presidency of Bosnia and Herzegovina
- Denis Zvizdić, former Chairman of the Council of Ministers of Bosnia and Herzegovina
- Diana Jenkins, Bosnian philanthropist, human rights activist, and entrepreneur
- Dritan Abazović, former Prime Minister of Montenegro
- Edvin Kanka Ćudić, Bosnian human rights activist
- Elmedin Konaković, foreign minister of Bosnia and Herzegovina and former Premier of Sarajevo Canton
- Hatidža Hadžiosmanović, former president of the Constitutional Court of Bosnia and Herzegovina
- Heather McRobie, British-Australian writer
- Ivica Osim, footballer and football coach
- Jasmila Žbanić, Bosnian film director
- Jasmin Geljo, Bosnian actor
- Jasmin Imamović, former mayor of Tuzla
- Jelena Silajdžić, Bosnian human rights activist
- Kemal Ademović, Bosnian politician
- Kornelije Kovač, Serbian composer
- Krešimir Zubak, former member of the Presidency of Bosnia and Herzegovina
- Mario Nenadić, former Premier of Sarajevo Canton
- Mato Tadić, former president of the Constitutional Court of Bosnia and Herzegovina
- Maya Sar, Bosnian singer
- Melina Borčak, Bosnian journalist
- Mile Akmadžić, former Prime Minister of the Republic of Bosnia and Herzegovina
- Miljenko Jergović, Bosnian writer
- Mirko Šarović, former member of the Presidency of Bosnia and Herzegovina
- Mirko Šundov, Chief of General Staff of the Croatian Armed Forces
- Mladen Vojičić, Bosnian singer
- Neda Ukraden, folk singer
- Omer Halilhodžić, automotive designer
- Predrag Finci, philosopher and essayist
- Radmila Hrustanović, former mayor of Belgrade
- Radovan Karadžić, Bosnian Serb former politician
- Radovan Višković, Bosnian Serb politician
- Rasim Ljajić, former deputy Prime Minister of Serbia
- Rifat Hadžiselimović, genetist
- Safet Isović, prominent Bosnian sevdalinka singer
- Seada Palavrić, member of the Constitutional Court of Bosnia and Herzegovina
- Selmo Cikotić, former minister of Security and Defence
- Semiha Borovac, former mayor of Sarajevo
- Senad Bašić, Bosnian actor
- Senad Hadžifejzović, journalist, news anchor and TV host
- Slavo Kukić, Bosnian sociologist and academic
- Sredoje Nović, former minister of Civil Affairs and director of the State Investigation and Protection Agency
- Sulejman Tihić, former member of the Presidency of Bosnia and Herzegovina
- Sven Alkalaj, former foreign minister of Bosnia and Herzegovina
- Šefik Džaferović, former member of the Presidency of Bosnia and Herzegovina
- Valerija Galić, president of the Constitutional Court of Bosnia and Herzegovina
- Vlado Pravdić, Bosnian organist
- Zdravko Čolić, Bosnian pop singer
- Zlatko Lagumdžija, former Chairman of the Council of Ministers of Bosnia and Herzegovina
- Zlatko Topčić, Bosnian writer
- Zukan Helez, defence minister of Bosnia and Herzegovina
- Željka Cvijanović, member of the Presidency of Bosnia and Herzegovina
- Željko Komšić, member of the Presidency of Bosnia and Herzegovina
- Živko Radišić, former member of the Presidency of Bosnia and Herzegovina
- Zora Stančič, Slovene graphic and visual artist

=== Faculty ===
- Adil Osmanović, former minister of Civil Affairs
- Alija Behmen, former mayor of Sarajevo and Prime Minister of the Federation of Bosnia and Herzegovina
- Bogić Bogićević, former member of the Presidency of Yugoslavia
- Danis Tanović, Oscar-winning director
- Dejan Milošević, theoretical physicist
- Denis Zvizdić, former chairman of the Council of Ministers of Bosnia and Herzegovina
- Ejup Ganić, former prime minister of the Federation of Bosnia and Herzegovina
- Hamdija Pozderac, president of SR Bosnia and Herzegovina from 1971 to 1974
- Haris Silajdžić, former member of the Presidency of Bosnia and Herzegovina
- Haris Pašović, director and founder of East West Theatre Company
- Muhamed Filipović, academic, writer, essayist, theorist and philosopher
- Nenad Kecmanović, former member of the Presidency of Bosnia and Herzegovina and rector of the University of Sarajevo
- Predrag Finci, philosopher and essayist
- Sifet Podžić, former minister of Defence and Chief of Joint Staff of the Armed Forces of Bosnia and Herzegovina
- Tomislav Dretar, writer, critic and philosopher
- Vojislav Šešelj, former deputy Prime Minister of Serbia
- Zdravko Grebo, founder of the Open Society Foundation of Bosnia and Herzegovina
- Zlatko Lagumdžija, former Chairman of the Council of Ministers of Bosnia and Herzegovina

== See also ==
- List of Islamic educational institutions
- Balkan Universities Network
- List of universities in Bosnia and Herzegovina
- Education in Bosnia and Herzegovina
- Lists of universities and colleges
- List of split up universities
