= Academy of Sciences and Arts of Bosnia and Herzegovina =

Bosnian national academy

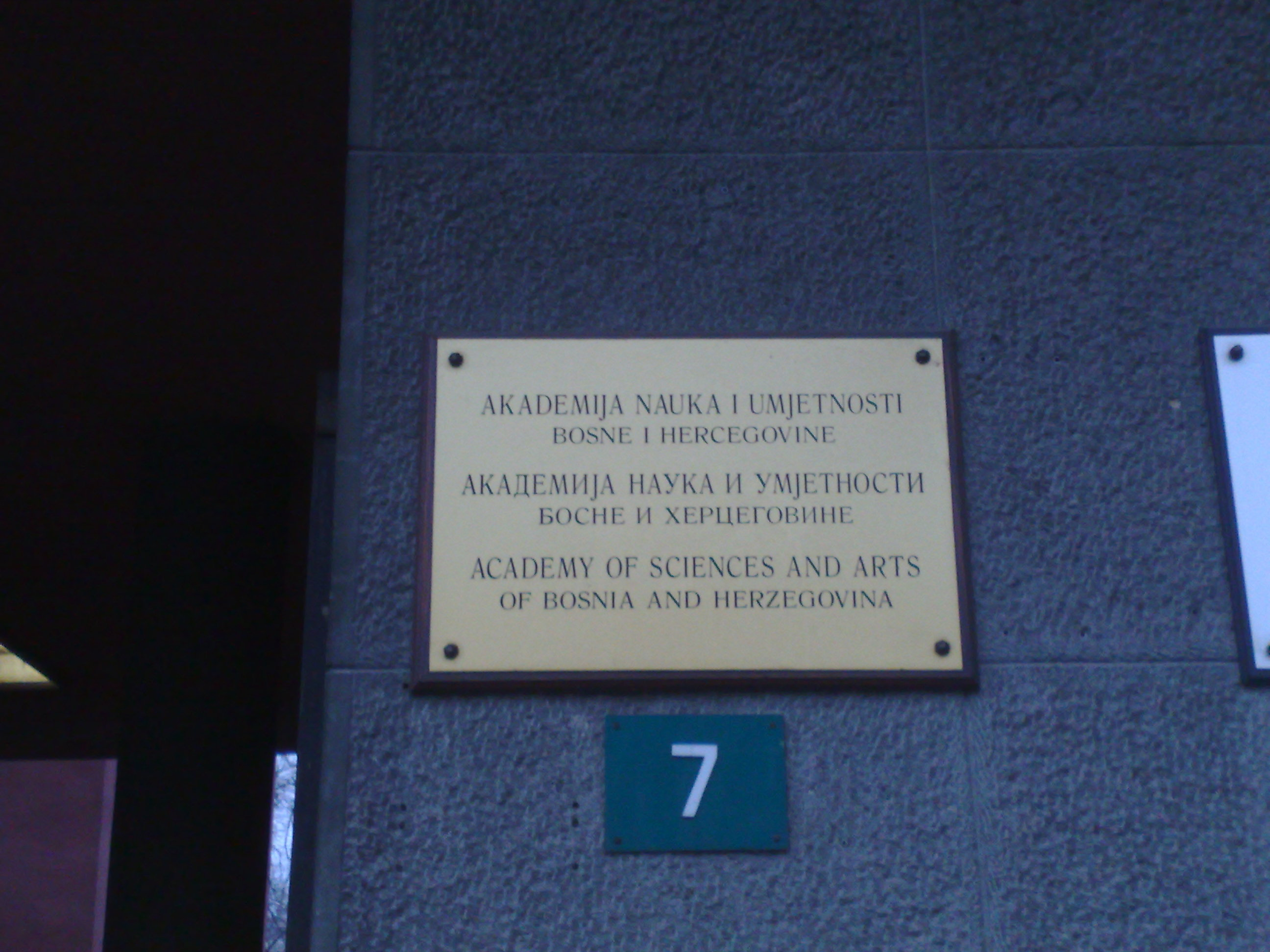
- Abbreviation: ANUBiH; AHУБиX
- Formation: 1951 in Sarajevo as the Academic Society of Bosnia and Herzegovina; 22 June 1966 as the Academy of Sciences and Arts of Bosnia and Herzegovina
- Type: National academy
- Purpose: Science, arts, academics
- Headquarters: Sarajevo, Bosnia and Herzegovina
- Members: 51 members (2019)
- President: Muris Čičić
- Main organ: Presidency of the Academy
- Website: www.anubih.ba

The Academy of Sciences and Arts of Bosnia and Herzegovina (Serbo-Croatian: Akademija nauka i umjetnosti Bosne i Hercegovine; Академија наука и умјетности Босне и Херцеговине) is the national academy of Bosnia and Herzegovina. The Academy, based in the capital city of Sarajevo, is the leading non-university public research institution in the country. The institution was established in 1951, during the time when the PR Bosnia and Herzegovina was a constituent part of Yugoslavia, as the Scientific Society of Bosnia and Herzegovina and upgraded into the Academy of Sciences and Arts of Bosnia and Herzegovina in 1966.

== History ==
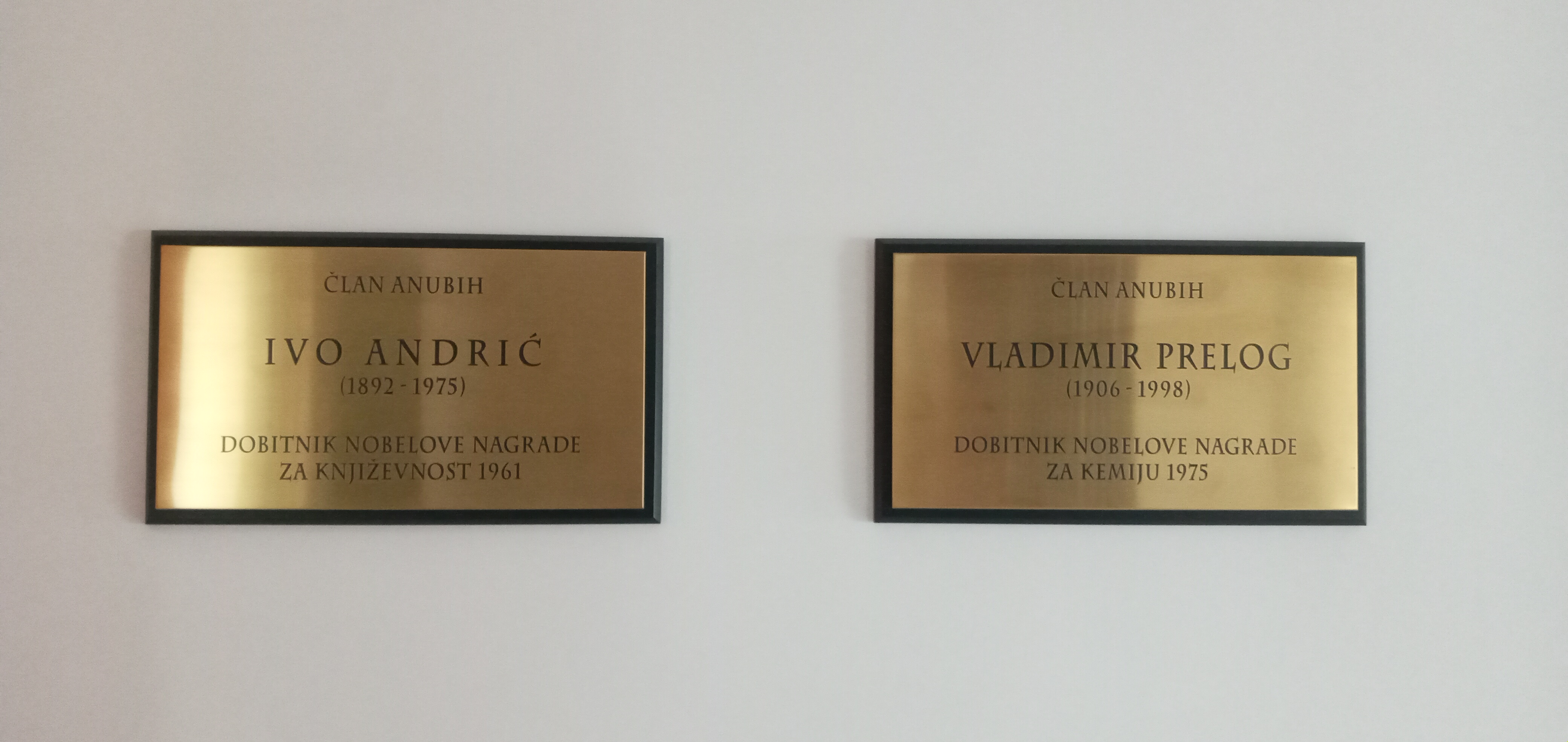
Plaques dedicated to Bosnian Nobel laureates Ivo Andrić and Vladimir Prelog at Academy of Sciences and Arts of Bosnia and Herzegovina in Sarajevo

The Academy of Sciences and Arts of Bosnia and Herzegovina arose out of the Scientific Society, founded in 1951, by the decision of the Assembly of the People's Republic of Bosnia and Herzegovina, the highest state authority in the country, on the formation of the Scientific Society of Bosnia and Herzegovina. The Scientific Society continued to operate as the highest-level institution concerned with science until the Assembly of Bosnia and Herzegovina passed a Law on the Academy of Sciences and Arts of Bosnia and Herzegovina in 1966. Its first president between 1966 and 1968 was Vaso Butozan. The Academy of Sciences and Arts of Bosnia and Herzegovina is charged, pursuant to this Law, with responsibility for the overall development of science and the arts, with organizing scientific research and arts-related events, with publishing papers written by its members and associates, and in general with the state of science and the arts and their development in Bosnia and Herzegovina. The Academy is a wholly independent body, governed solely by the principles and interests of science and the independent convictions of its members. The Academy's Statute governs all aspects of its organization, management and operations in all the fields in which it is active.

== Departments ==
The Academy is made up of six departments:

- Social sciences
- Medicine sciences
- Technical sciences
- Natural sciences and mathematics
- Literature
- Arts

== Committees ==
Committees include:

- Library and documentation
- Council for international cooperation
- Publication council
- Scientific, technological and social development

== Notable people ==
=== Presidents ===
- Vaso Butozan (1966–1968)
- Branislav Đurđev (1968–1971)
- Edhem Čamo (1971–1977)
- Alojz Benac (1977–1981)
- Svetozar Zimonjić (1981–1990)
- Seid Huković (1990–1999)
- Božidar Matić (1999–2014)
- Miloš Trifković (2014–2020)
- Muris Čičić (2020–present)

=== Honorary members ===
- Josip Broz Tito elected 19 November 1969
- Ivo Andrić elected 23 December 1969
- Rodoljub Čolaković elected 23 December 1969
- Edvard Kardelj elected 29 April 1971
- Vladimir Bakarić elected 18 April 1974
- Ivan Supek elected 14 May 2002
- Bogdan Bogdanović elected 14 May 2002
- Adil Zulfikarpašić elected 14 May 2002

== See also ==
- Academy of Sciences and Arts of the Republika Srpska
- Bosniak Academy of Sciences and Arts
- Center for Demographic Genetics of Academy of Sciences and Arts of Bosnia and Herzegovina
