= Sarajevo =

Capital and largest city of Bosnia and Herzegovina

Sarajevo Сарајево
- Capital city
- Grad Sarajevo; Град Сарајево; City of Sarajevo
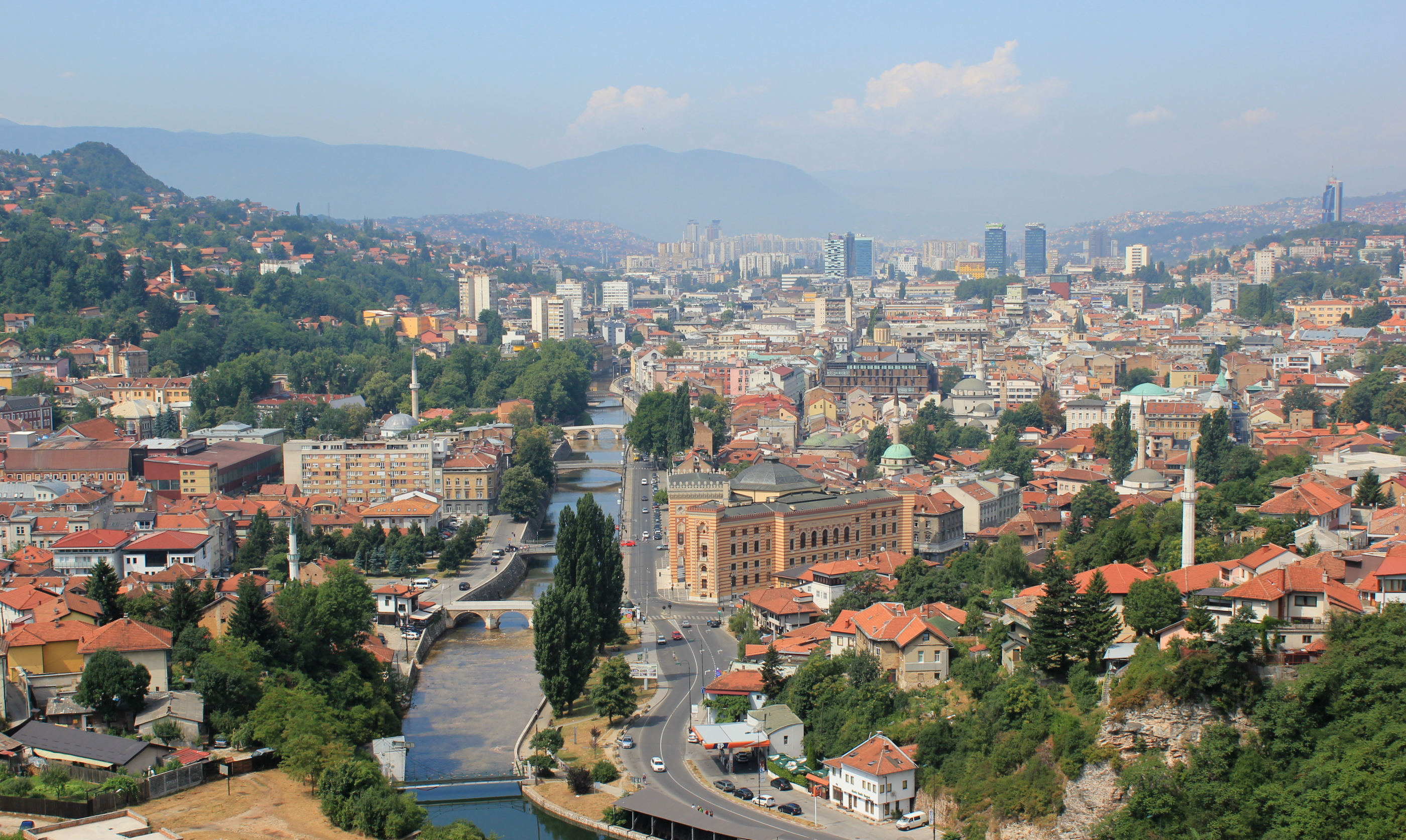
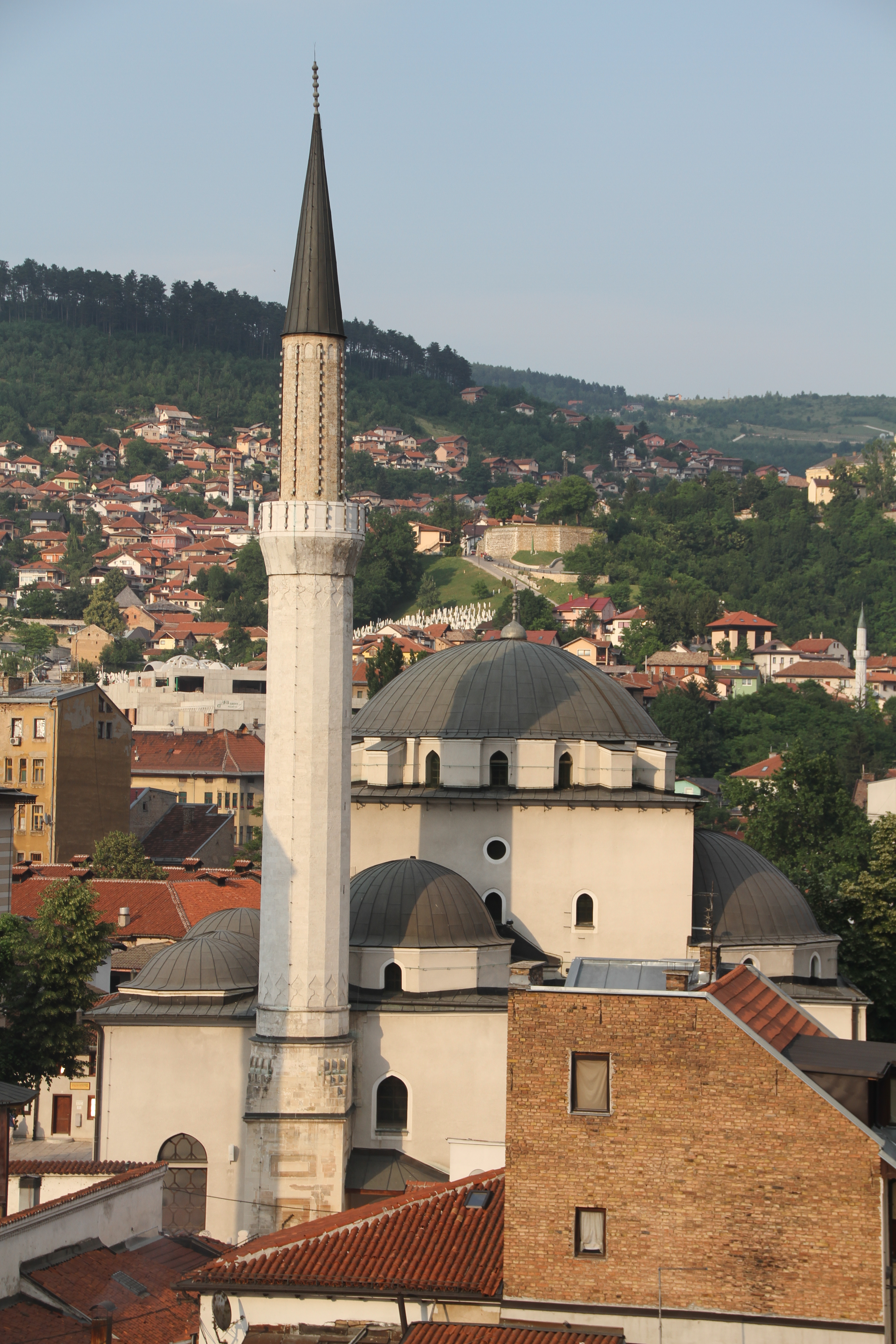
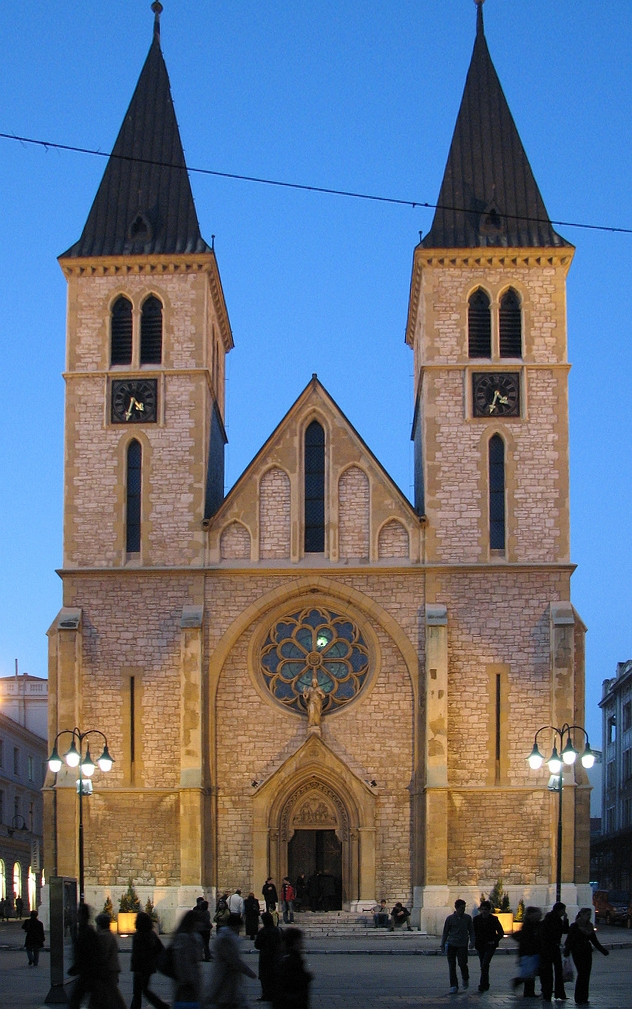
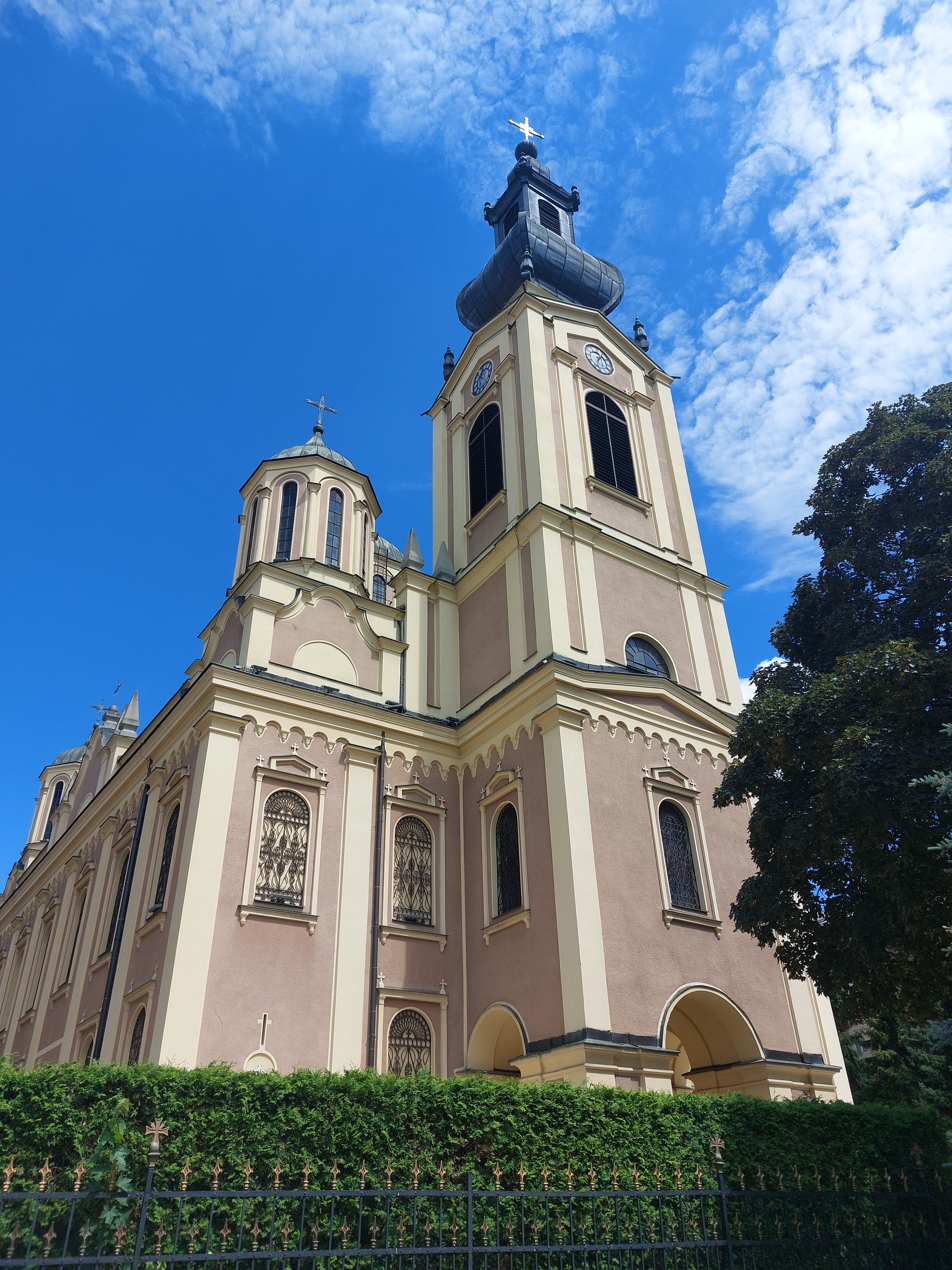
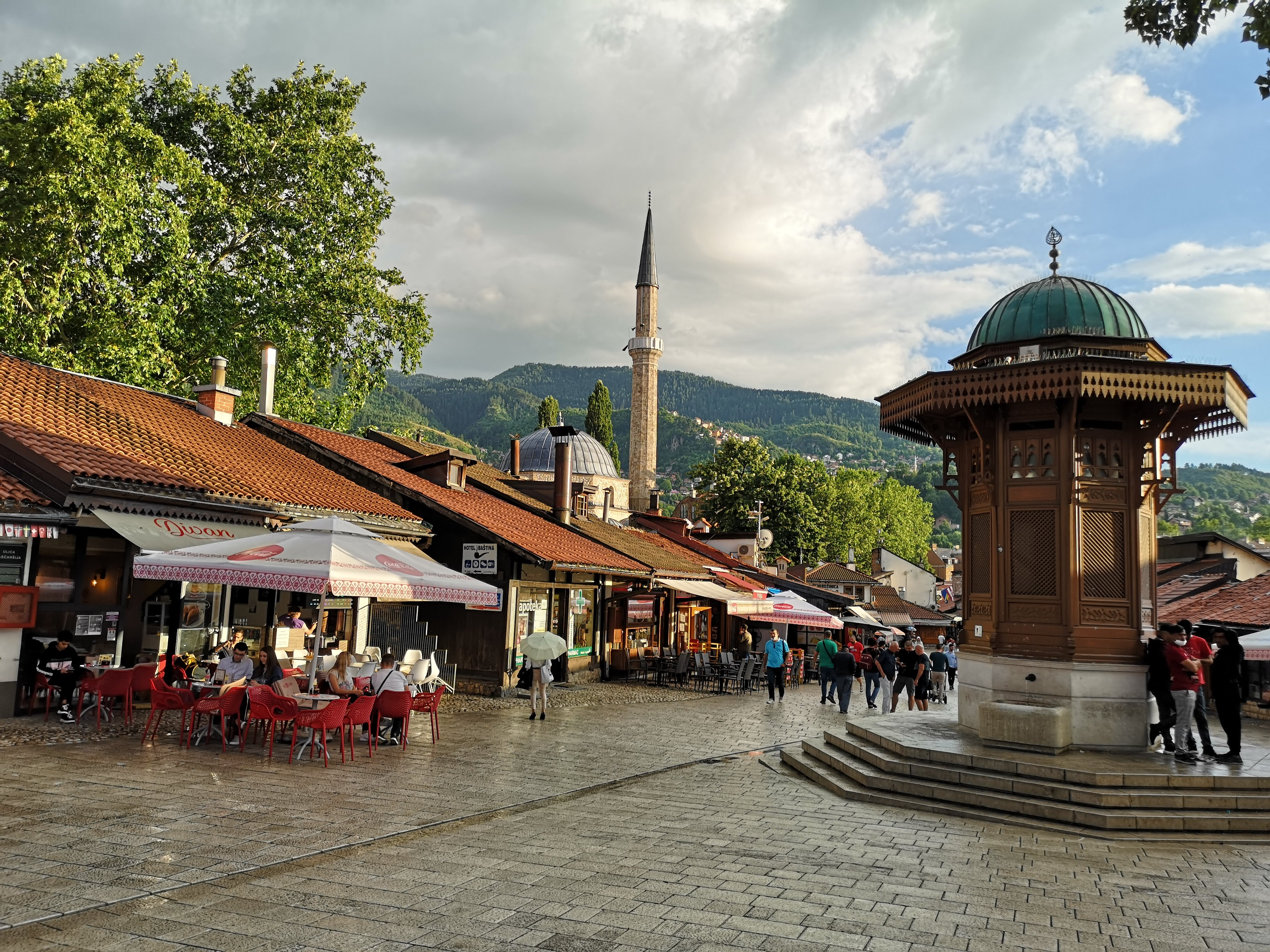
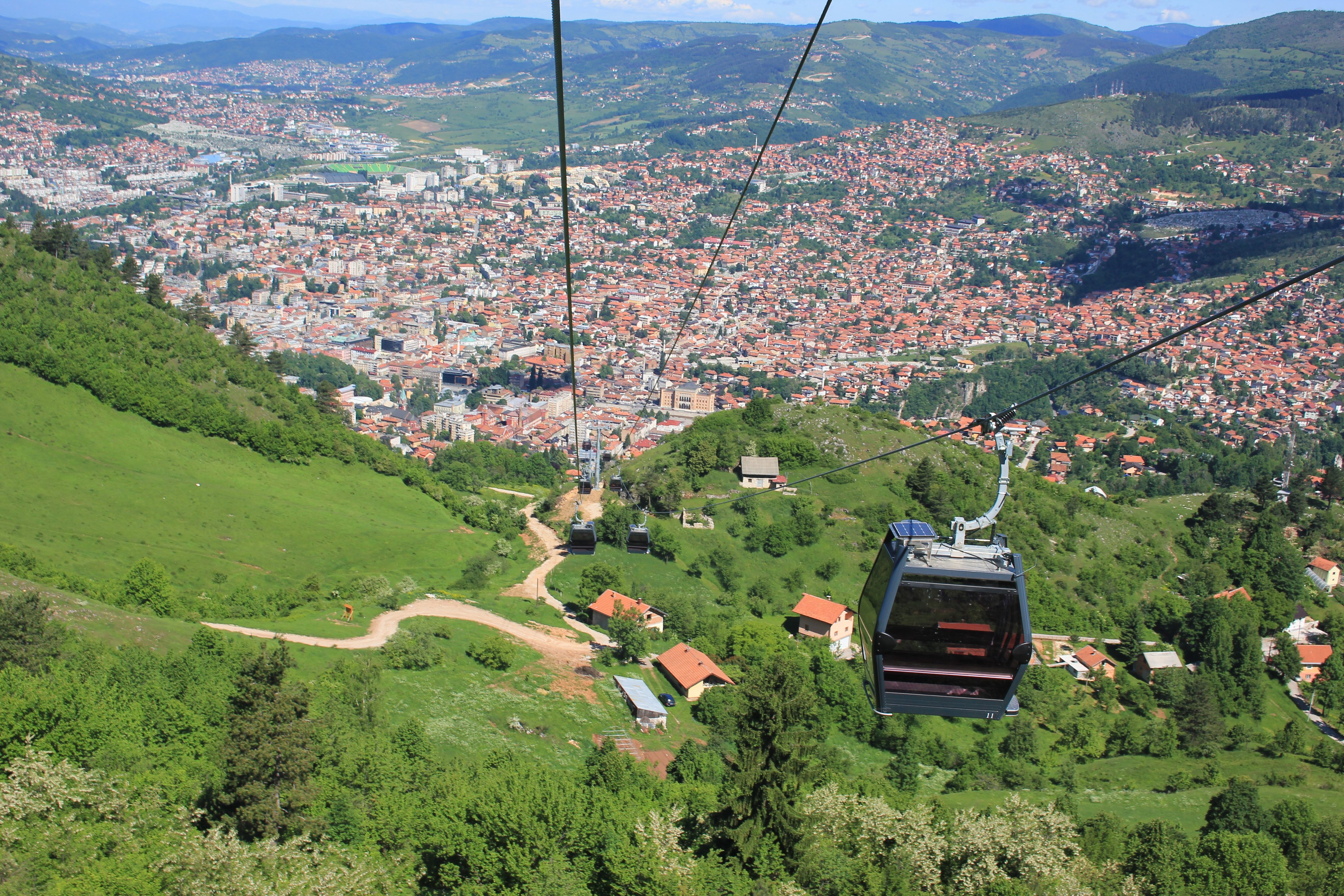
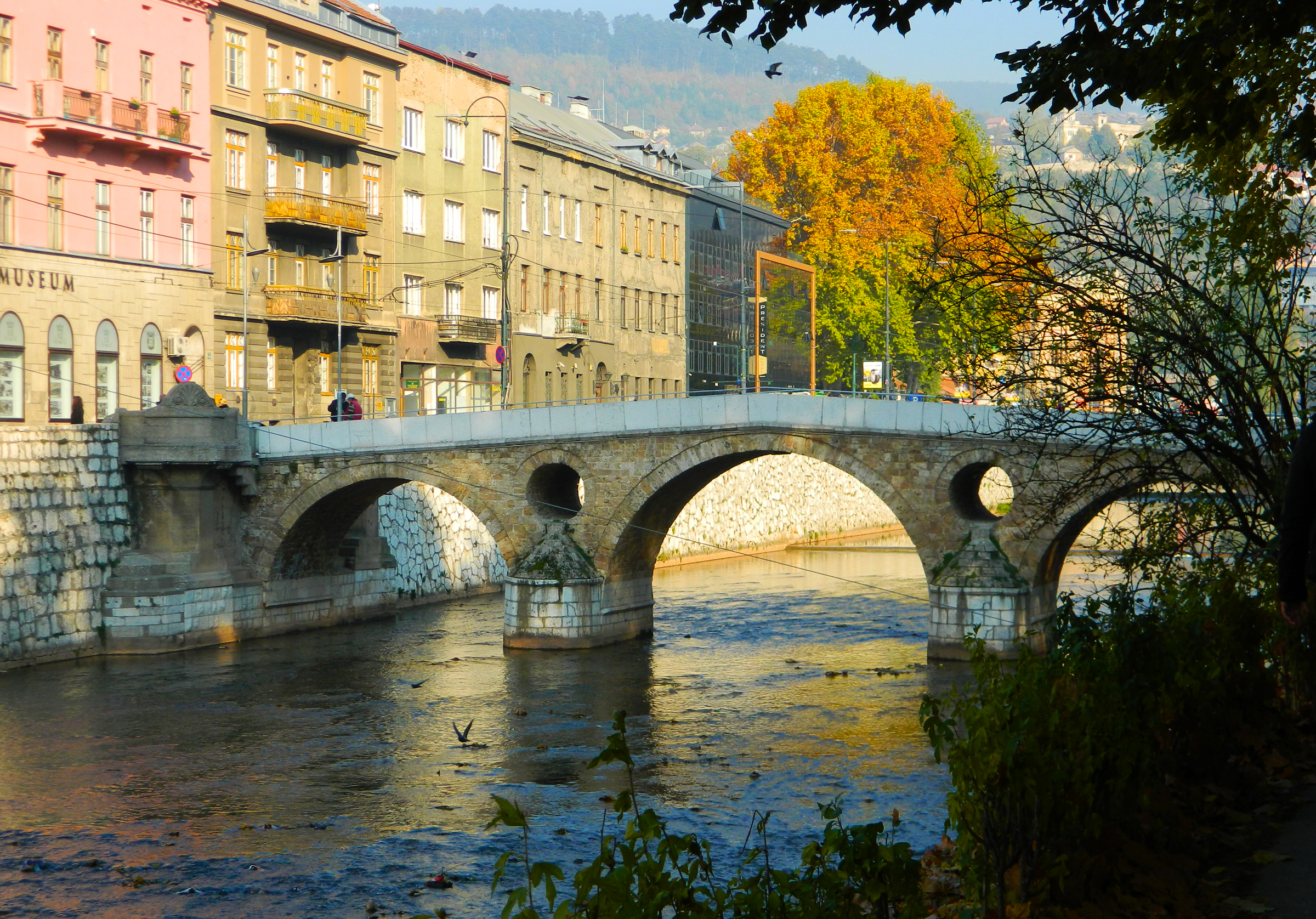
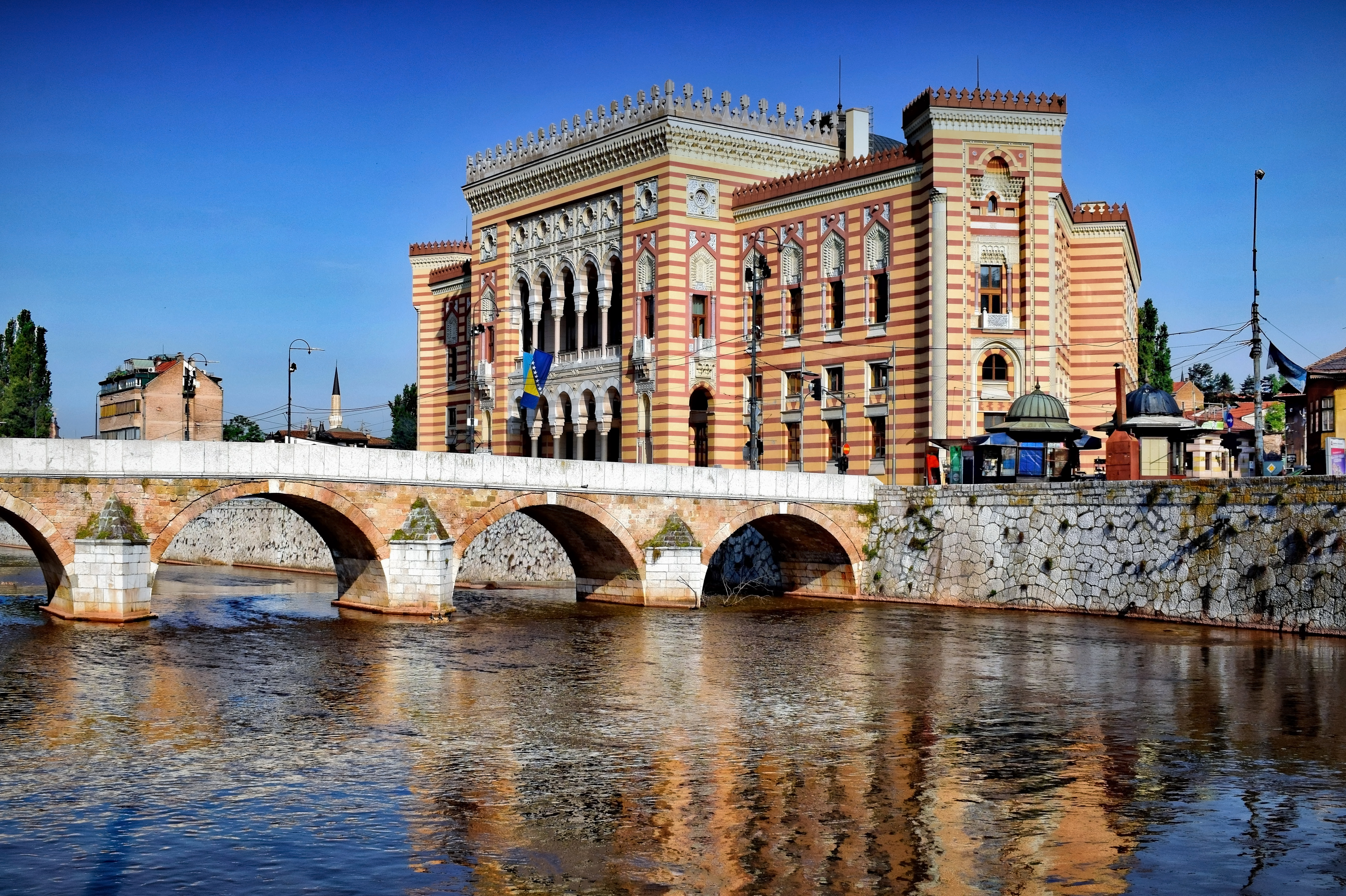
- Old Town and Center skyline Gazi Husrev-beg Mosque Sacred Heart Cathedral Serb Orthodox Cathedral Baščaršija Sarajevo cable car Latin Bridge Šeher-Ćehaja Bridge in front of Vijećnica

- Flag Coat of arms
- Nickname(s): "Šeher, Rajvosa"
- Interactive map of Sarajevo
- Location within Bosnia and Herzegovina Location within Europe
- Coordinates: 43°51′23″N 18°24′47″E
- Country: Bosnia and Herzegovina
- Entity: Federation of Bosnia and Herzegovina
- Canton: Sarajevo Canton
- Municipalities: Centar; Novi Grad; Novo Sarajevo; Stari Grad: 4
- Founded: 1461; 565 years ago

Government
  - Body: Sarajevo City Council
  - Mayor: Samir Avdić (NiP)

Area
  - City proper: 141.5 km^{2} (54.6 sq mi)
  - Urban: 351.2 km^{2} (135.6 sq mi)
- Elevation: 550 m (1,800 ft)

Population (2013 census)
  - City proper: 275,524
  - Density: 1,947/km^{2} (5,043/sq mi)
  - Urban: 394,002
  - Urban density: 1,122/km^{2} (2,906/sq mi)
  - Metro: 555,210
  - Demonym: Sarajevan (en); Sarajlija (Сарајлија) (m.); Sarajka (Сарајка) (f.) (bs)
- Time zone: UTC+1 (CET)
  - Summer (DST): UTC+2 (CEST)
- Postal code: 71000
- Area code: +387 33
- Major airport: Sarajevo International Airport
- Website: sarajevo.ba

Sarajevo (Note: English: /ˌsærəˈjeɪvoʊ/ SARR-ə-YAY-voh; Serbo-Croatian: Сарајево, pronounced [sǎrajevo]; see names in other languages.) is the capital and largest city of Bosnia and Herzegovina, with a population of 275,524 in its administrative limits. The Sarajevo Canton, containing the city of Sarajevo and nearby municipalities, is home to 413,593 inhabitants. Located within the greater Sarajevo valley of Bosnia, it is surrounded by the Dinaric Alps and situated along the Miljacka River in the heart of the Balkans, a region of Southeastern Europe.

Sarajevo is the political, financial, social, and cultural centre of Bosnia and Herzegovina and a prominent centre of culture in the Balkans. It exerts region-wide influence in entertainment, media, fashion, and the arts. Due to its long history of religious and cultural diversity, Sarajevo is sometimes called the "Jerusalem of Europe" or "Jerusalem of the Balkans". It is one of a few major European cities to have a mosque, Catholic church, Eastern Orthodox church, and synagogue within the same neighborhood. It is also home to the former Yugoslavia's first institution of tertiary education in the form of an Islamic polytechnic, today part of the University of Sarajevo.

Although there is evidence of human settlement in the area since prehistoric times, the modern city arose in the 15th century as an Ottoman stronghold when the Ottoman Empire extended into Europe. Sarajevo has gained international renown several times throughout its history. In 1914, Sarajevo was the site of the assassination of Archduke Franz Ferdinand by a local Young Bosnia activist Gavrilo Princip, a murder that sparked World War I. This led to the end of Austro-Hungarian rule in Bosnia and the creation of the multicultural Kingdom of Yugoslavia in the Balkans. Later, after World War II, the area was designated the capital of the communist Socialist Republic of Bosnia and Herzegovina within the Socialist Federal Republic of Yugoslavia, leading to rapid population growth and business expansion, with investment in infrastructure and economic development.

In 1984, Sarajevo hosted the 1984 Winter Olympics, which marked a prosperous era for the city. However, after the start of the Yugoslav Wars, the city endured the longest siege of a capital city in modern history, lasting 1,425 days from April 1992 to February 1996, during the Bosnian War. With continued post-war reconstruction in its aftermath, Sarajevo is the fastest-growing city in Bosnia and Herzegovina. In 2006, the travel guide series Lonely Planet ranked Sarajevo as the 43rd best city in the world. In December 2009, it recommended Sarajevo as one of the top ten cities to visit in 2010.

In 2011, Sarajevo was nominated as the 2014 European Capital of Culture. It was also selected with Istočno Sarajevo to host the 2019 European Youth Olympic Winter Festival. In addition, in October 2019, Sarajevo was designated as a UNESCO Creative City for having placed culture at the center of its development strategies, and is also ranked as a UNESCO City of Film. In October 2024, National Geographic declared Sarajevo as the best world destination for 2025 according to its readers.

== Etymology ==
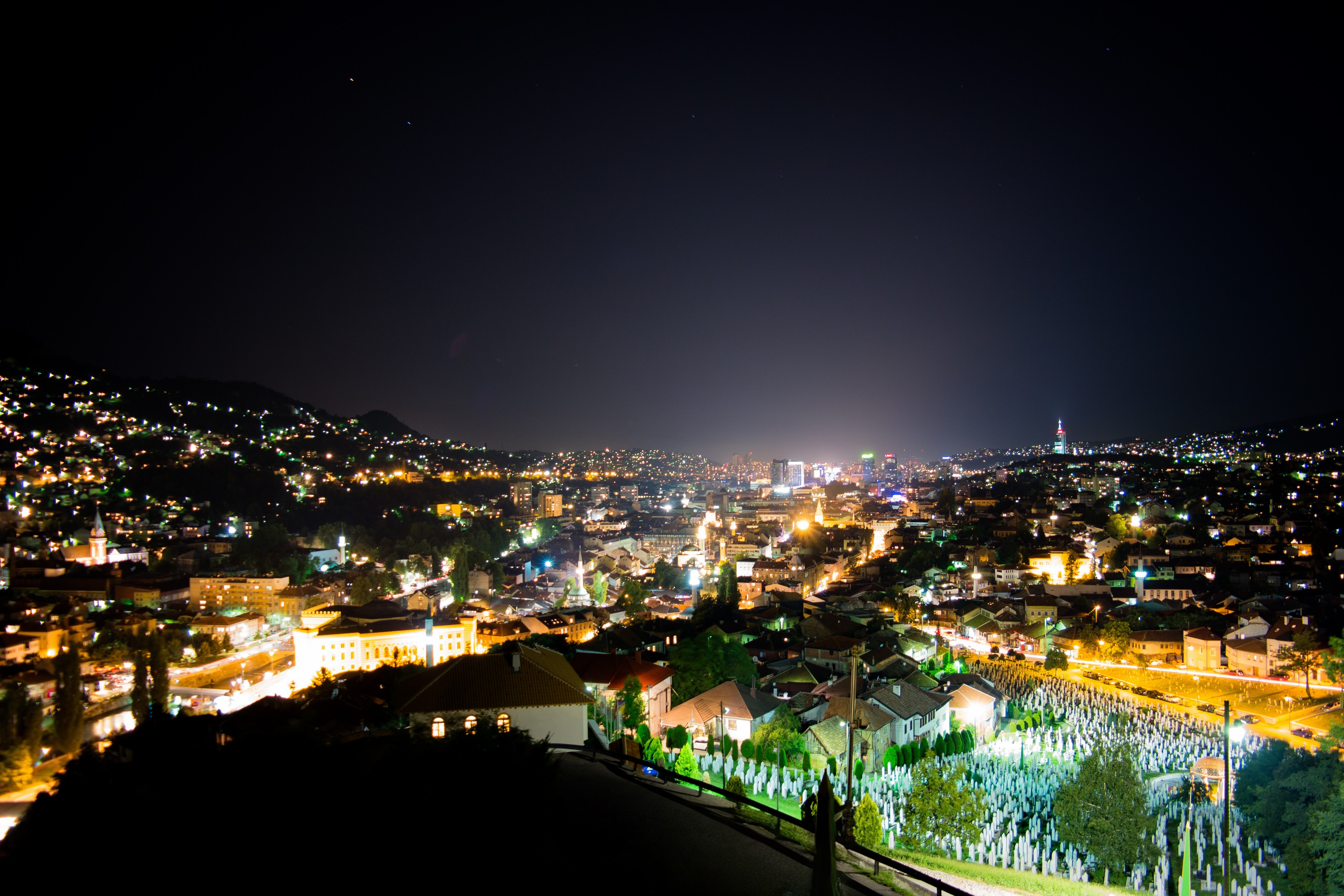
Sarajevo at night

The name Sarajevo derives from the Turkish noun saray, meaning "palace" or "mansion" (from Persian sarāy, سرای, of the same meaning). Scholars disagree on the origin of the evo attached to the end. In Slavic languages, the addition of "-evo" may indicate a possessive noun, thereby making the name of Sarajevo 'city of the palace'.

One theory is that the name may have been derived from the Ottoman Turkish term saray ovası, first recorded in 1455, meaning "the plains around the palace" or simply "palace plains".

However, in his Dictionary of Turkish Loanwords, Abdulah Škaljić maintains that the evo ending is more likely to have come from the widespread Slavic suffix evo used to indicate place names, than from the Turkish ending ova. The first mention of the name Sarajevo was in a 1507 letter written by Firuz Bey. The official name during the 400 years of Ottoman rule was Saraybosna ("Palace of Bosnia"), which remains the city's name in Modern Turkish.

Sarajevo has had many nicknames. The earliest is Šeher, the term Isa-Beg Ishaković used to describe the town he was going to construct—which is Turkish for "city" (şehir), in turn coming from the Persian shahr (شهر, meaning "city"). As Sarajevo developed, numerous nicknames came from comparisons to other cities in the Islamic world, i.e. "Damascus of the North".

== Environment ==
=== Geography ===
Sarajevo is near the geometric center of the triangular-shaped Bosnia and Herzegovina and within the historical region of Bosnia. It is situated 518 m (1,699 ft) above sea level and lies in the Sarajevo valley, in the middle of the Dinaric Alps.

The valley was once an expansive, fertile, and green space, but considerable urban expansion and development took place following World War II. Forested hills and five major mountains surround the city. The highest of the surrounding peaks is Treskavica at 2,088 m (6,850 ft), followed by Bjelašnica mountain at 2,067 m (6,781 ft), Jahorina at 1,913 m (6,276 ft), Trebević at 1,627 m (5,338 ft), and Igman the shortest at 1,502 m (4,928 ft). The last four are also known as the Olympic Mountains of Sarajevo.

When the city hosted the 1984 Winter Olympics, venues were constructed at these mountains for many winter sports events. The city is developed within hilly terrain; some steeply inclined streets and residences perch on the hillsides.

The Miljacka river is one of the city's chief geographic features. It flows through the city from east through the center of Sarajevo to the west part of the city, where it eventually meets up with the Bosna river. Miljacka River is also known as "The Sarajevo River". Its source (Vrelo Miljacke) is 2 km (1.2 mi) south of the town of Pale at the foothills of Mount Jahorina, several kilometers to the east of Sarajevo center. The Bosna's source, Vrelo Bosne near Ilidža (west Sarajevo), is another notable natural landmark and a popular destination for Sarajevans and other tourists. Several smaller rivers and streams, such as Koševski Potok, also run through the city and its vicinity.

=== Cityscape ===
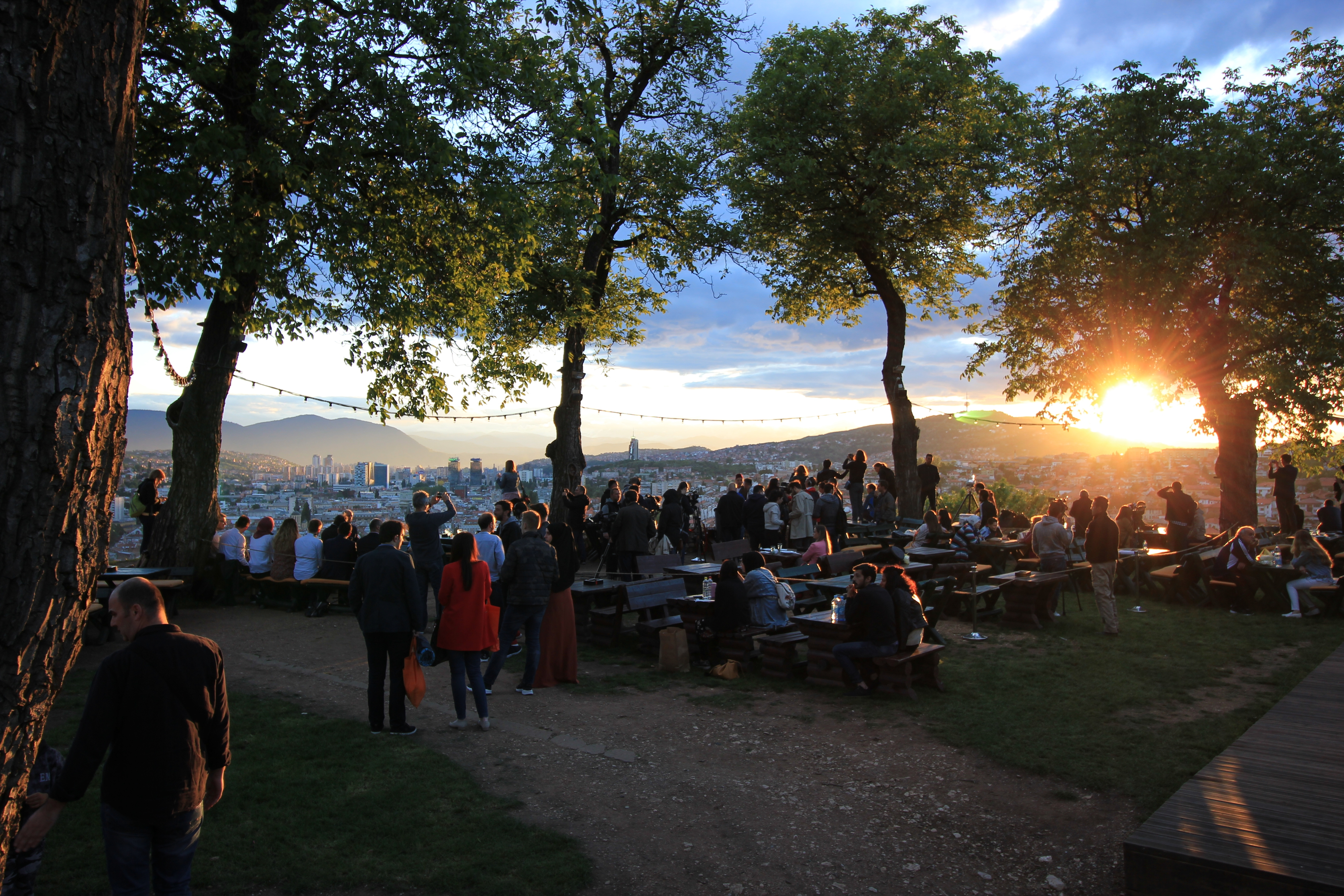
View of Sarajevo from a popular Yellow Bastion lookout

Sarajevo is close to the center of the triangular shape of Bosnia and Herzegovina in southeastern Europe. The Sarajevo city consists of four municipalities: Centar (Center), Novi Grad (New Town), Novo Sarajevo (New Sarajevo), and Stari Grad (Old Town).

The Metropolitan area was reduced in the 1990s after the war and the Dayton-imposed administrative division of the country, with several municipalities partitioned along the border of the newly recognized Federation of Bosnia and Herzegovina (FBiH) and Republika Srpska (RS), creating several new municipalities which together form the city of Istočno Sarajevo in the Republika Srpska: Istočna Ilidža, Istočno Novo Sarajevo, Istočni Stari Grad, Lukavica, Pale (RS-section), and Trnovo (RS-section), along with the municipality of Sokolac (which was not traditionally part of the Sarajevo area and was not partitioned).

The city has an urban area of 1,041.5 km^{2} (402.1 sq mi). Veliki Park (Great Park) is the largest green area in the center of Sarajevo. It is nestled between Titova, Koševo, Džidžikovac, Tina Ujevića and Trampina Streets and in the lower part there is a monument dedicated to the Children of Sarajevo.

=== Climate ===
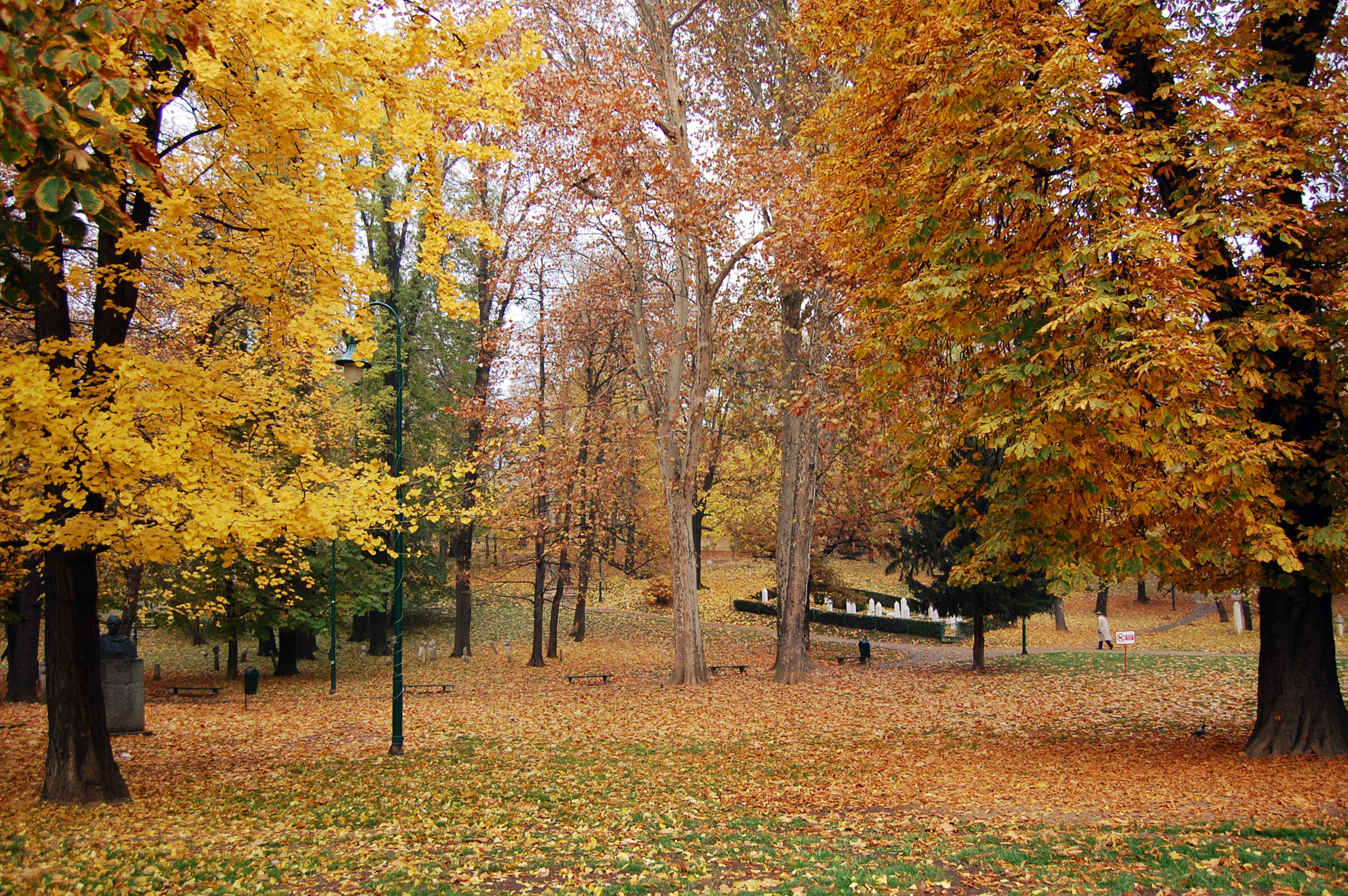
Autumn in Sarajevo – Veliki Park

Sarajevo has an oceanic climate (Köppen climate classification: Cfb) bordering on a humid continental climate (Köppen climate classification: Dfb). Sarajevo's climate exhibits four seasons and uniformly spread precipitation. The proximity of the Adriatic Sea moderates Sarajevo's climate somewhat, although the mountains to the south of the city greatly reduce this maritime influence. The average yearly temperature is 11.1 °C (52 °F), with January (0.6 °C (33.1 °F) on average) being the coldest month of the year and August (21.3 °C (70.3 °F) on average) the warmest.

The highest recorded temperature was 40.0 °C (104 °F) on 19 August 1946, while the lowest recorded temperature was −26.2 °C (−15.2 °F) on 25 January 1942. On 13 August 2024, Sarajevo recorded a temperature of 39.7 °C (103.5 °F), the highest since 1946. On average, Sarajevo has 32 days where the temperature exceeds 30 °C (86.0 °F) and 83 days where the temperature drops below 0 °C (32 °F) per year. The city typically experiences mildly cloudy skies, with an average yearly cloud cover of 45%.

The cloudiest month is December (75% average cloud cover), while the clearest is August (37%). Moderate precipitation occurs fairly consistently throughout the year, with an average 75 days of rainfall. Suitable climatic conditions have allowed winter sports to flourish in the region, as exemplified by the 1984 Winter Olympics that were held in Sarajevo. Average winds are 28–48 km/h (17–30 mph) and the city has 1,895 hours of sunshine.

Climate data for Sarajevo (1991–2020 normals), extremes 1901-present
Month	Jan	Feb	Mar	Apr	May	Jun	Jul	Aug	Sep	Oct	Nov	Dec	Year
Record high °C (°F)	18.2 (64.8)	22.0 (71.6)	26.6 (79.9)	30.2 (86.4)	33.2 (91.8)	38.8 (101.8)	38.9 (102.0)	40.0 (104.0)	38.0 (100.4)	32.2 (90.0)	24.7 (76.5)	19.1 (66.4)	40.0 (104.0)
Mean maximum °C (°F)	13.2 (55.8)	16.5 (61.7)	21.0 (69.8)	25.1 (77.2)	28.8 (83.8)	32.7 (90.9)	35.3 (95.5)	35.8 (96.4)	31.4 (88.5)	26.2 (79.2)	19.5 (67.1)	13.8 (56.8)	36.9 (98.4)
Mean daily maximum °C (°F)	4.1 (39.4)	6.6 (43.9)	11.5 (52.7)	16.5 (61.7)	21.4 (70.5)	25.4 (77.7)	27.8 (82.0)	28.3 (82.9)	22.5 (72.5)	17.3 (63.1)	10.6 (51.1)	4.3 (39.7)	16.4 (61.4)
Daily mean °C (°F)	0.6 (33.1)	2.4 (36.3)	6.5 (43.7)	10.8 (51.4)	15.2 (59.4)	19.0 (66.2)	21.0 (69.8)	21.3 (70.3)	16.5 (61.7)	11.9 (53.4)	6.7 (44.1)	1.3 (34.3)	11.1 (52.0)
Mean daily minimum °C (°F)	−2.9 (26.8)	−1.9 (28.6)	1.4 (34.5)	5.1 (41.2)	9.0 (48.2)	12.6 (54.7)	14.2 (57.6)	14.3 (57.7)	10.4 (50.7)	6.5 (43.7)	2.8 (37.0)	−1.7 (28.9)	5.4 (41.7)
Mean minimum °C (°F)	−10.9 (12.4)	−8.9 (16.0)	−5.4 (22.3)	−0.9 (30.4)	3.6 (38.5)	7.6 (45.7)	9.8 (49.6)	9.7 (49.5)	5.5 (41.9)	1.0 (33.8)	−3.8 (25.2)	−9.2 (15.4)	−13.2 (8.2)
Record low °C (°F)	−26.2 (−15.2)	−23.4 (−10.1)	−16.4 (2.5)	−10.0 (14.0)	0.9 (33.6)	3.2 (37.8)	5.4 (41.7)	4.4 (39.9)	−2.2 (28.0)	−10.9 (12.4)	−19.3 (−2.7)	−22.4 (−8.3)	−26.4 (−15.5)
Average precipitation mm (inches)	68.3 (2.69)	67.3 (2.65)	66.7 (2.63)	78.1 (3.07)	88.7 (3.49)	87.8 (3.46)	75.1 (2.96)	62.9 (2.48)	89.3 (3.52)	91.4 (3.60)	84.9 (3.34)	89.0 (3.50)	949.5 (37.39)
Average rainy days	9.6	9.6	9.4	10.8	11.1	10.3	8.7	7.4	8.8	8.7	8.9	10.2	113.5
Average snowy days	5	5	4	1	0	0	0	0	0	1	2	4	22
Average relative humidity (%)	77.1	71.8	65.7	63.8	65.9	66.3	65.1	65.6	71.2	73.6	75.6	79.7	70.1
Mean monthly sunshine hours	82.2	101.6	144.8	157.6	193.8	231.4	255.7	239.9	176.6	155.2	94.5	62.1	1,895.4
Percentage possible sunshine	20	30	38	42	48	54	59	62	50	40	25	17	43
Source 1: WMO
Source 2: FHMZ / NOAA

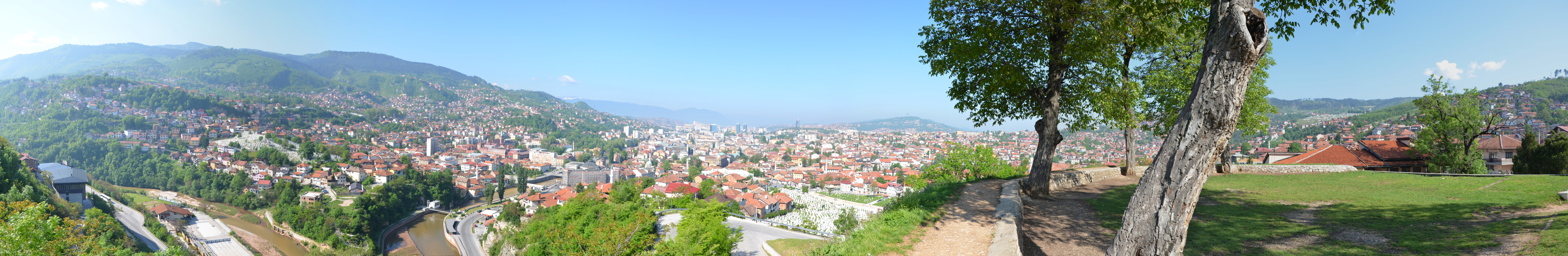
A panoramic view of Sarajevo valley from "Yellow Bastion" (Žuta tabija) lookout, spring 2012

=== Air quality ===
Air pollution is a major issue in Sarajevo. According to the 2016 World Health Organization's Ambient Air Pollution Database, the annual average PM2.5 concentration in 2010 was estimated to be 30 μg/m^{3} based on PM10 measurement, which is 3 times higher than recommended by WHO Air Quality Guidelines for the annual average PM2.5. There are no recent direct long-term PM2.5 measurements available in Sarajevo and only estimates can be made from PM10, which is less health-relevant than PM2.5. Real-time air quality data in the form of PM10, ozone, NO_{2}, CO and SO_{2} by the Federal Hydrometeorological Institute.

== History ==
Historical affiliations

Ottoman Empire 1461–1878 de facto, 1908 de jure

- Austro-Hungarian Empire 1878 de facto, 1908 de jure–1918
- State of Slovenes, Croats and Serbs 1918
- Kingdom of Serbs, Croats and Slovenes 1918–1929
- Kingdom of Yugoslavia 1929–1941
- Independent State of Croatia 1941–1945
- SFR Yugoslavia 1945–1992
- Republic of Bosnia and Herzegovina 1992–1995
- Bosnia and Herzegovina 1995–present

=== Ancient times ===
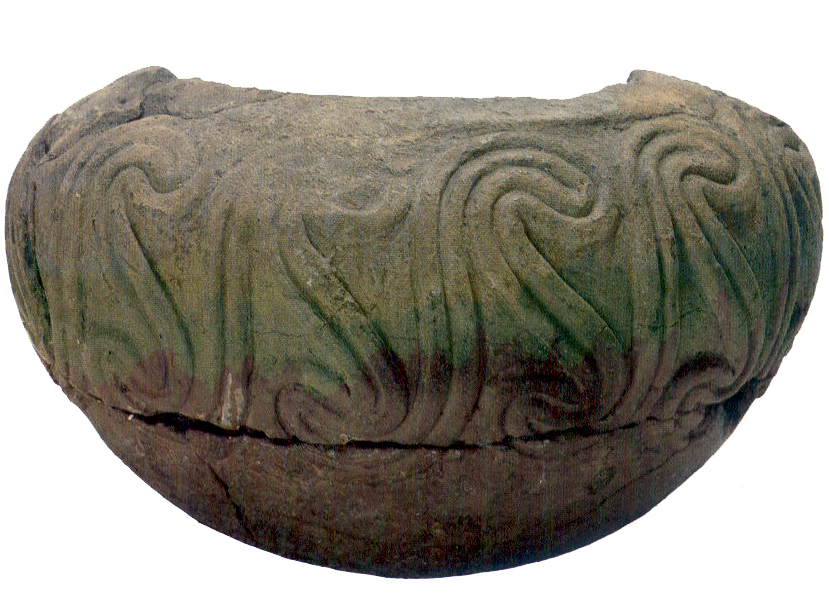
Neolithic period Butmir vase

One of the earliest findings of settlement in the Sarajevo area is that of the Neolithic Butmir culture. The discoveries at Butmir were made on the grounds of the modern-day Sarajevo suburb Ilidža in 1893 by Austro-Hungarian authorities during the construction of an agricultural school. The area's richness in flint was attractive to Neolithic humans, and the settlement flourished. The settlement developed unique ceramics and pottery designs, which characterize the Butmir people as a unique culture, as described at the International Congress of Archaeologists and Anthropologists meeting in Sarajevo in 1894.

The next prominent culture in Sarajevo was the Illyrians. The ancient people, who considered most of the Western Balkans as their homeland, had several key settlements in the region, mostly around the river Miljacka and the Sarajevo valley. The Illyrians in the Sarajevo region belonged to the Daesitiates, the last Illyrian people in Bosnia and Herzegovina to resist Roman occupation. Their defeat by the Roman emperor Tiberius in 9 AD marks the start of Roman rule in the region. The Romans never built up the region of modern-day Bosnia, but the Roman colony of Aquae Sulphurae was near the top of present-day Ilidža, and was the most important settlement of the time. After the Romans, the Goths settled the area, followed by the Slavs in the 7th century.

=== Middle Ages ===
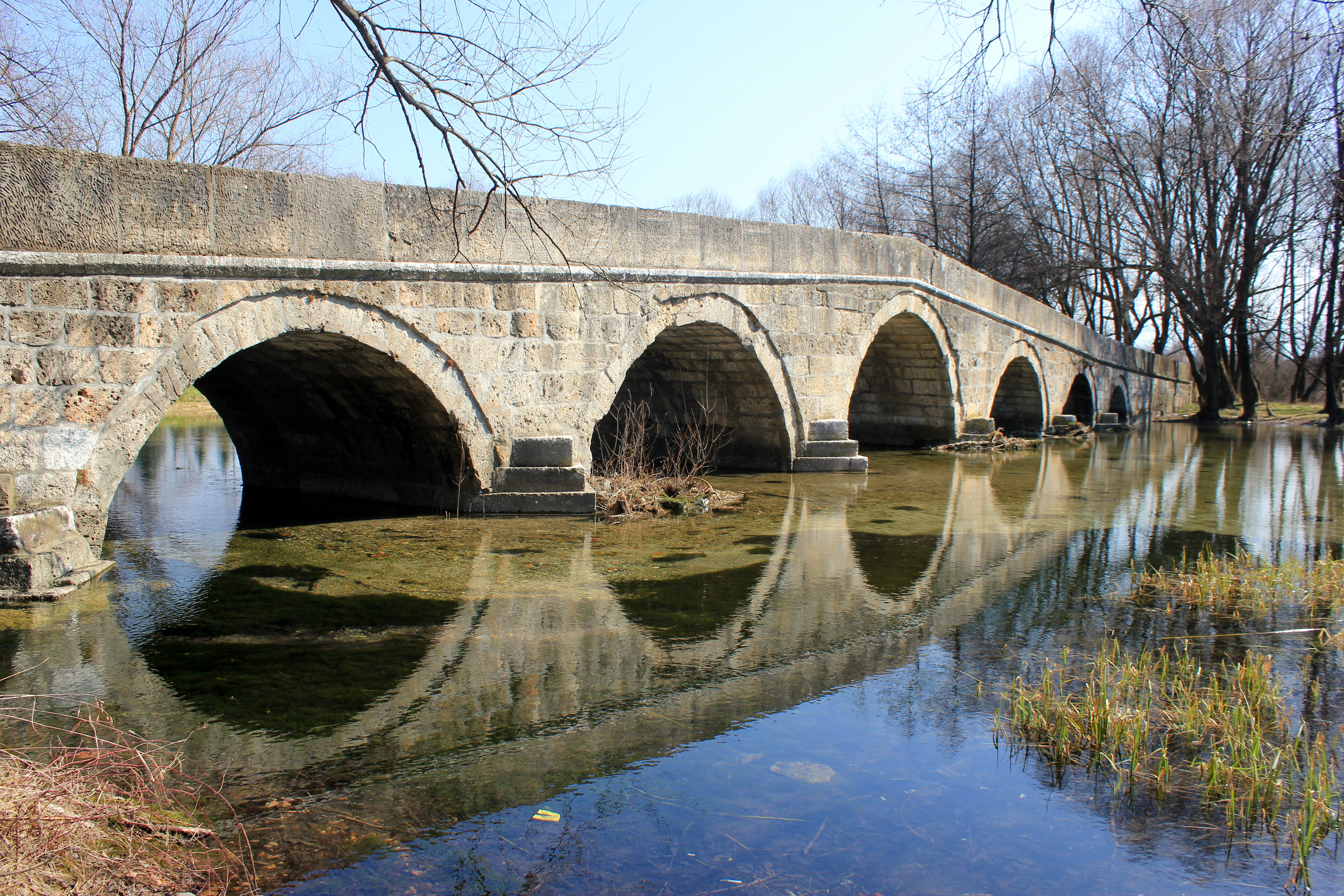
Roman bridge, erected 1530 in Ilidža, built of remnants of an old Roman settlement

During the Middle Ages, Sarajevo was part of the Bosnian province of Vrhbosna near the traditional center of the Kingdom of Bosnia. Though a city named Vrhbosna existed, the exact settlement in Sarajevo at this time is debated. Various documents note a place called Tornik in the region, most likely in the area of the Marijin Dvor neighborhood. By all indications, Tornik was a very small marketplace surrounded by a proportionally small village and was not considered very important by Ragusan merchants.

Other scholars say that Vrhbosna was a major town in the wider area of modern-day Sarajevo. Papal documents say that in 1238, a cathedral dedicated to Saint Paul was built in the area. Disciples of the notable saints Cyril and Methodius stopped in the region, founding a church near Vrelo Bosne. Whether or not the town was somewhere in the area of modern-day Sarajevo, the documents attest to its and the region's importance. There was also a citadel Hodidjed north-east to the Old City, dating from around 1263 until it was occupied by the Ottoman Empire in 1429.

=== Ottoman era ===
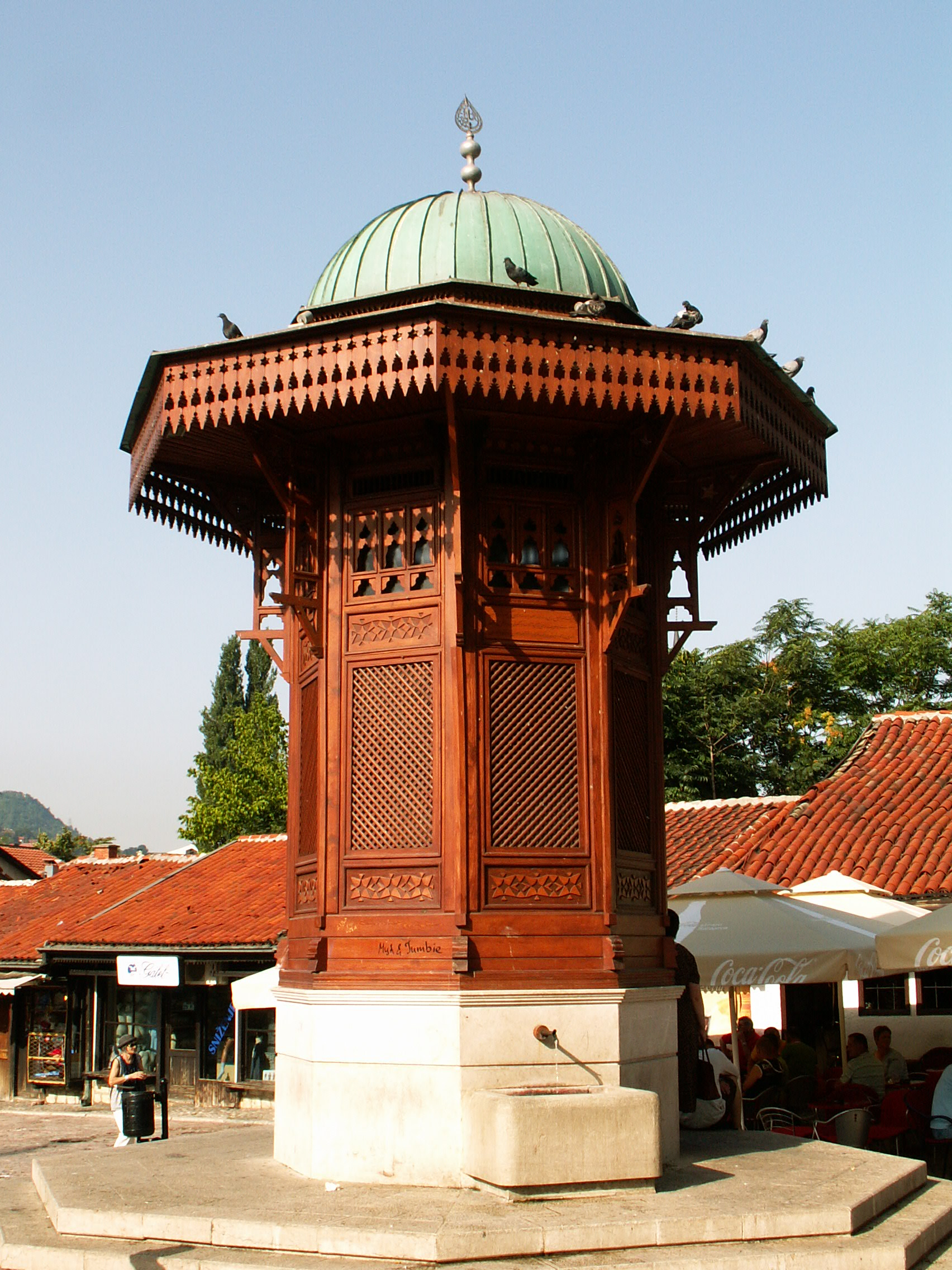
The Sebilj is a pseudo-Ottoman style wooden fountain in the centre of Baščaršija square. The current structure is an 1891 reconstruction of the original, which was constructed in 1753 and burnt down in 1852

Sarajevo was founded by the Ottoman Empire in the 1450s upon its conquest of the region, with 1461 used as the city's founding date. The first Ottoman governor of Bosnia, Isa-Beg Ishaković, transformed the cluster of villages into a city and state capital by building several key structures, including a mosque, a closed marketplace, a hamam, a caravansarai, a bridge, and of course the governor's palace ("Saray"), which gave the city its present name in conjunction with "evo". The mosque was named "Careva Džamija" (the Emperor's Mosque) in honor of Sultan Mehmed II. With the improvements, Sarajevo quickly grew into the largest city in the region. By the 15th century the settlement was established as a city, named Bosna-Saraj, around the citadel in 1461.

Following the expulsion of Jews from Spain at the end of the 15th century, and the invitation from the Ottoman Empire to resettle their population, Sephardic Jews arrived in Sarajevo, which over time would become a leading center of Sephardic culture and the Ladino language. Though relatively small in size, a Jewish quarter would develop over several blocks in Baščaršija.

Many local Christians converted to Islam at this time. To accommodate the new pilgrims on the road to Mecca, in 1541, Gazi Husrev-beg's quartermaster Vekil-Harrach built a pilgrim's mosque which it is still known to this day as the Hadžijska Mosque.

Under leaders such as the second governor Gazi Husrev-beg, Sarajevo grew at a rapid rate. Husrev-beg greatly shaped the physical city, as most of what is now the Old Town was built during his reign. Sarajevo became known for its large marketplace and numerous mosques, which by the middle of the 16th century numbered more than 100. At the peak of the empire, Sarajevo was the biggest and most important Ottoman city in the Balkans after Istanbul. By 1660, the population of Sarajevo was estimated to be over 80,000. By contrast, Belgrade in 1683 had 100,000, and Zagreb as late as 1851 had 14,000 people. As political conditions changed, Sarajevo became the site of warfare.

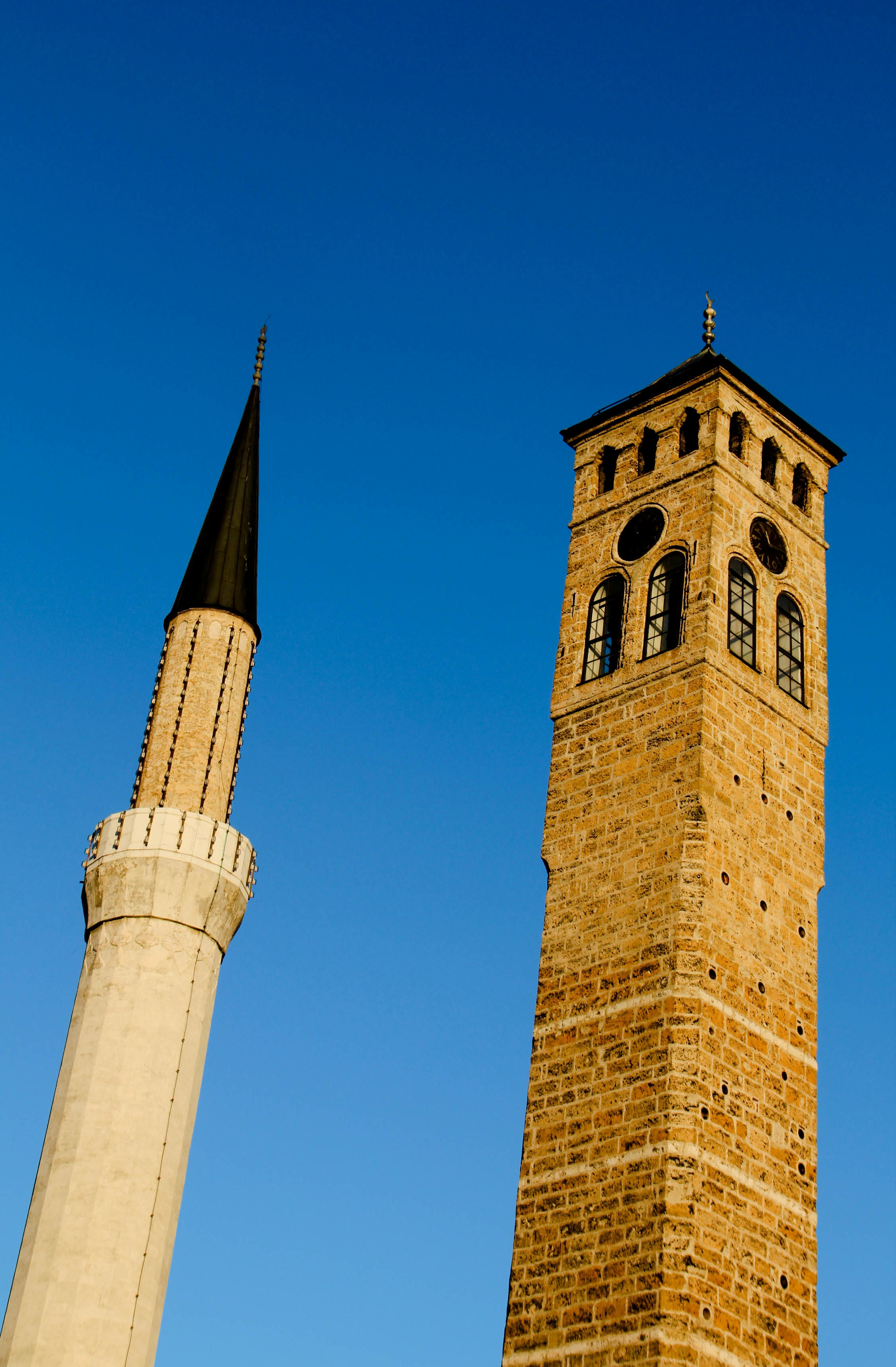
Gazi Husrev-beg Mosque and the Sarajevo Clock Tower

In 1697, during the Great Turkish War, a raid was led by Prince Eugene of Savoy of the Habsburg monarchy against the Ottoman Empire, which conquered Sarajevo and left it plague-infected and burned to the ground. After his men had looted thoroughly, they set the city on fire and destroyed nearly all of it in one day. Only a handful of neighborhoods, some mosques, and an Orthodox church were left standing. Numerous other fires weakened the city, which was later rebuilt but never fully recovered from the destruction. By 1807, it had only some 60,000 residents.

In the 1830s, several battles of the Bosnian uprising had taken place around the city. These had been led by Husein Gradaščević. Today, a major city street is named Zmaj od Bosne (Dragon of Bosnia) in his honor. The rebellion failed and for several more decades, the Ottoman state remained in control of Bosnia.

The Ottoman Empire made Sarajevo an important administrative center by 1850. Baščaršija became the central commercial district and cultural center of the city in the 15th century when Isa-Beg Ishaković founded the town. The toponym Baščaršija derives from the Turkish language.

=== Austria-Hungary ===
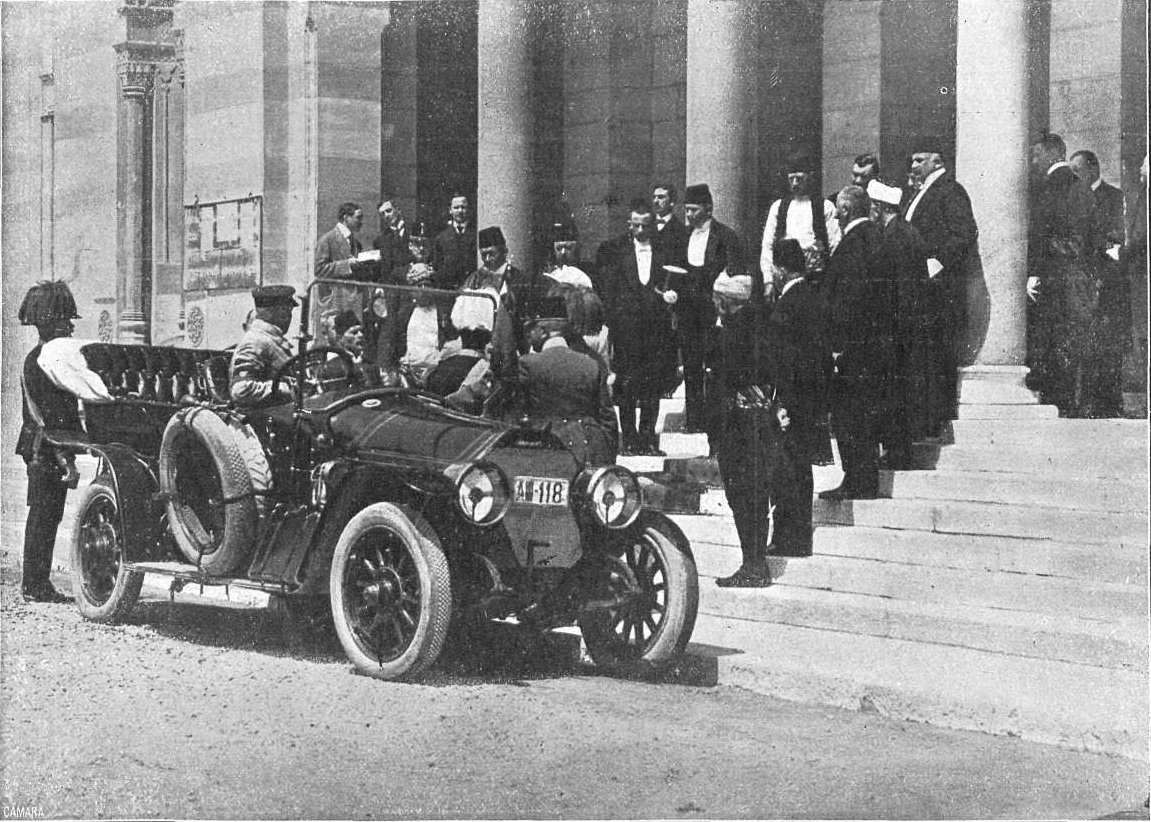
Archduke Franz Ferdinand of Austria arrives at the city hall on the day of his assassination, 28 June 1914

Austria-Hungary's occupation of Bosnia and Herzegovina came in 1878 as part of the Treaty of Berlin, and complete annexation followed in 1908, angering the Serbs. Sarajevo was industrialized by Austria-Hungary, who used the city as a testing area for new inventions such as tramways, which were established in 1885 before they were later installed in Vienna. Architects and engineers wanting to help rebuild Sarajevo as a modern European capital rushed to the city. A fire that burned down a large part of the central city area (čaršija) left more room for redevelopment. As a result, the city has a unique blend of the remaining Ottoman city market and contemporary Western architecture. Sarajevo also has some examples of Secession- and Pseudo-Moorish (Moorish Revival) styles that date from this period.

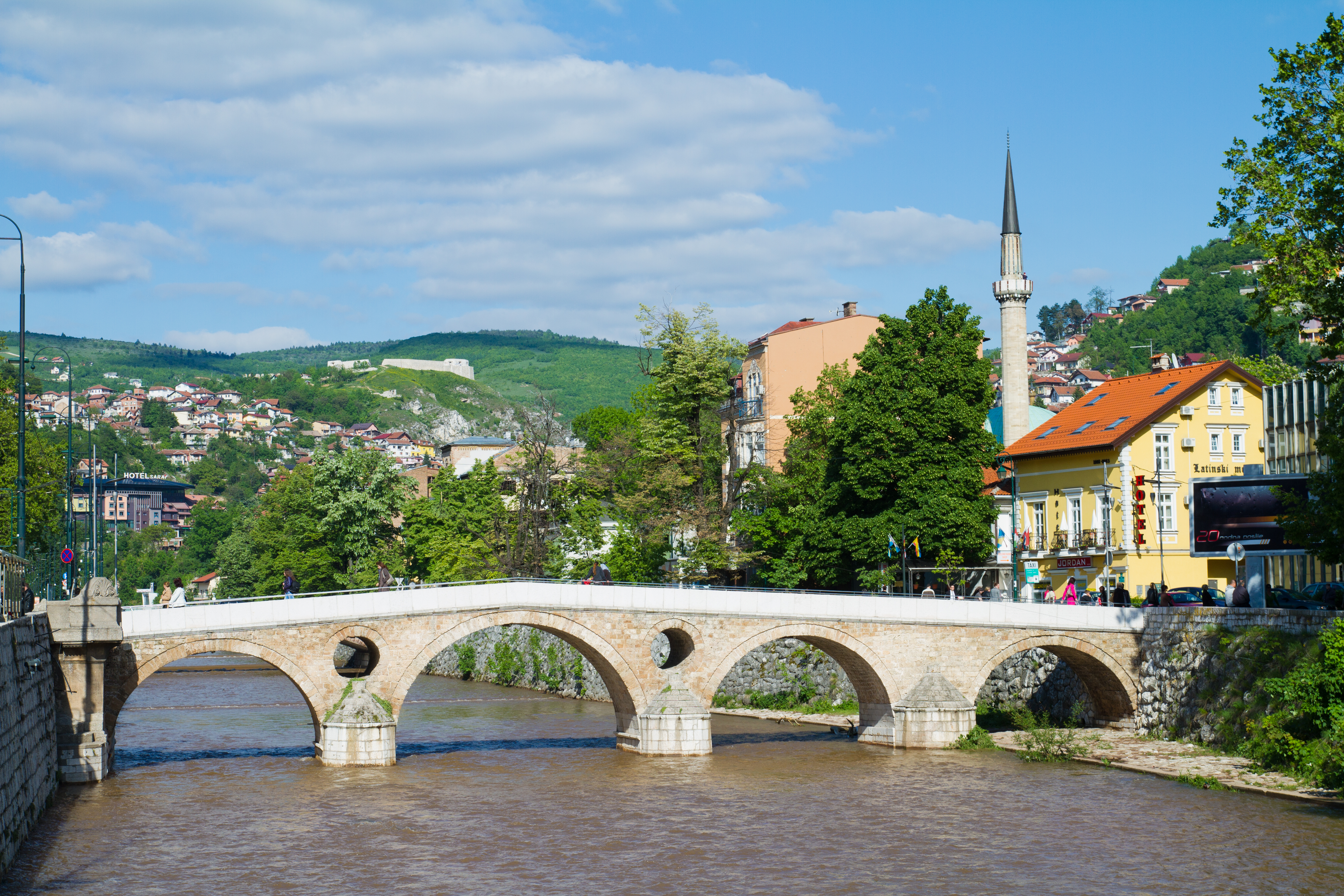
The Latin Bridge was the site of the assassination of Franz Ferdinand

The Austro-Hungarian period was one of great development for the city, as the Western power brought its new acquisition up to the standards of the Victorian age. Various factories and other buildings were built at this time, and a large number of institutions were both Westernized and modernized. For the first time in history, Sarajevo's population began writing in Latin script. For the first time in centuries, the city significantly expanded outside its traditional borders. Much of the city's contemporary central municipality (Centar) was constructed during this period.

Architecture in Sarajevo quickly developed into a wide range of styles and buildings. The Sacred Heart Cathedral, for example, was constructed using elements of neo-gothic and Romanesque architecture. The National Museum, Sarajevo brewery, and City Hall were also constructed during this period. Additionally, Austrian officials made Sarajevo the first city in this part of Europe to have a tramway.

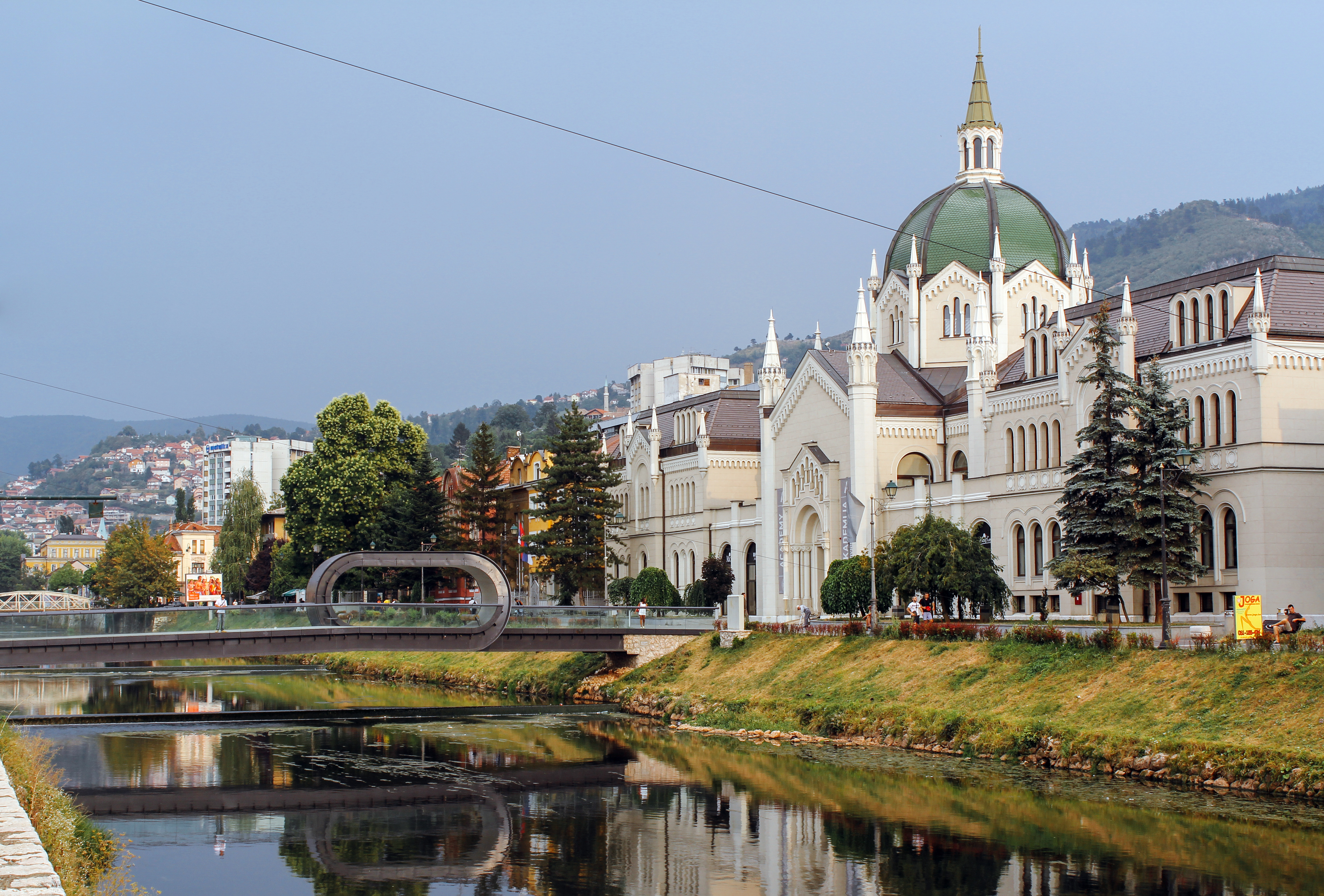
The Academy of Fine Arts was originally built to serve as an Evangelical Church in 1899

Although the Bosnia Vilayet de jure remained part of the Ottoman Empire, it was de facto governed as an integral part of Austria-Hungary with the Ottomans having no say in its day-to-day governance. This lasted until 1908 when the territory was formally annexed and turned into a condominium, jointly controlled by both Austrian Cisleithania and Hungarian Transleithania.

The event that triggered World War I was the assassination of Archduke Franz Ferdinand of Austria, along with his wife Sophie, Duchess of Hohenberg in Sarajevo on 28 June 1914 by Gavrilo Princip, a Bosnian Serb and self-declared Yugoslav, and member of Young Bosnia. This was followed by the Anti-Serb riots in Sarajevo, which resulted in two deaths and destruction of property.

In the ensuing war, however, most of the Balkan offensives occurred near Belgrade, and Sarajevo largely escaped damage and destruction. Following the war, Bosnia was annexed into the Kingdom of Yugoslavia, and Sarajevo became the capital of the Drina Province.

=== Yugoslavia ===
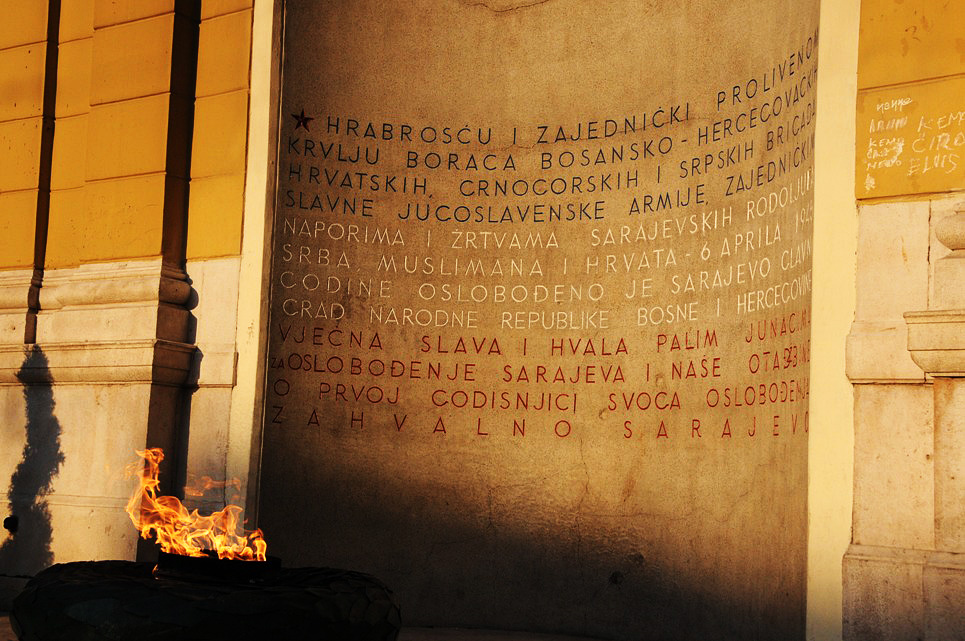
The Eternal flame, a memorial to the military and civilian victims of World War II in Sarajevo

After World War I and pressure from the Royal Serbian Army, alongside rebelling Slavic nations in Austria-Hungary, Sarajevo became part of the Kingdom of Yugoslavia. Though it held some political significance as the center of first the Bosnian region and then the Drinska Banovina, the city was no longer a national capital and saw a decline in global influence.

During World War II, the Kingdom of Yugoslavia's army was overrun by German and Italian forces. Following a German bombing campaign, Sarajevo was captured on 15 April 1941 by the 16th Motorized Infantry Division. The Axis powers created the Independent State of Croatia and included Sarajevo in its territory.

Immediately following the occupation, the main Sephardi Jewish synagogue, Il Kal Grande, was looted, burned, and destroyed by the Nazis. Within a matter of months, the centuries-old Sephardi and Ashkenazi Jewish communities of Sarajevo, comprising the vast majority of Bosnian Jewry, would be rounded up in the Old Synagogue (Stari hram) and deported to their deaths in Croatian concentration camps. Roughly 85% of Bosnia's Jewish population would perish at the hands of the Nazis and the Ustaše during the Holocaust in the region. The Sarajevo Haggadah was the most important artifact which survived this period, smuggled out of Sarajevo and saved from the Nazis and Ustaše by the chief librarian of the National Museum, Derviš Korkut.

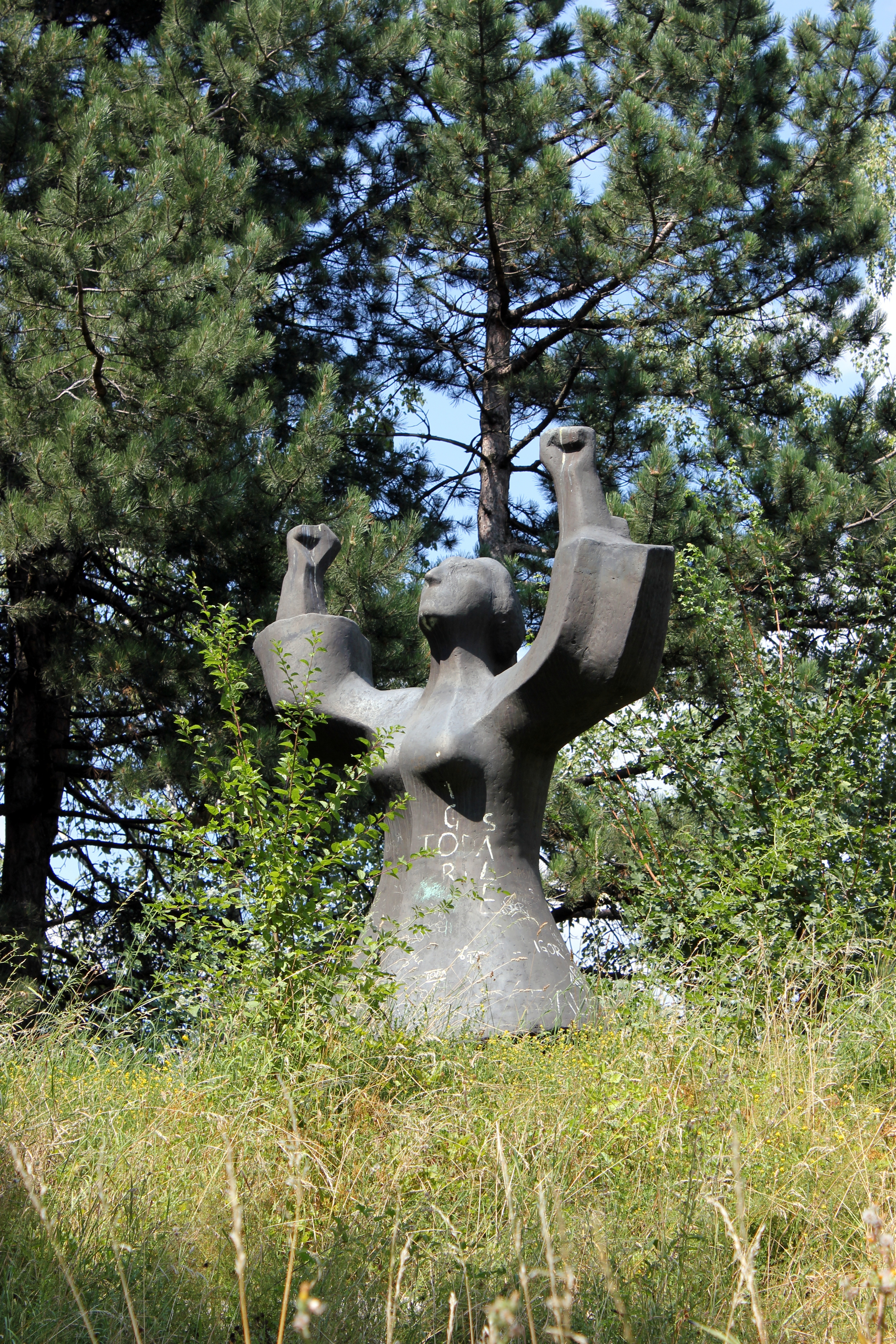
Vraca Memorial Park is a park dedicated to World War II victims in the city

On 12 October 1941, a group of 108 notable Bosniak citizens of Sarajevo signed the Resolution of Sarajevo Muslims by which they condemned the Genocide of Serbs organized by the Ustaše, made a distinction between the Bosniaks who participated in such persecutions and the rest of the Bosniak population, presented information about the persecutions of Bosniaks by the Ustaše, and requested security for all citizens of the country, regardless of their identity. During the summer of 1941, Ustaše militia periodically interned and executed groups of Sarajevo Serbs. In August 1941, they arrested about one hundred Serbs suspected of ties to the resistance armies, mostly church officials and members of the intelligentsia, and executed them or deported them to concentration camps. By mid-summer 1942, around 20,000 Serbs found refuge in Sarajevo from Ustaše terror.

The city was bombed by the Allies from 1943 to 1944. The Yugoslav Partisan movement was represented in the city. In the period February–May 1945, Maks Luburić set up a Ustaše headquarters in a building known as Villa Luburić and used it as a torture and execution place whose 323 victims were identified after the war. The resistance was led by Vladimir Perić Valter, who died while leading the liberation of the city on 6 April 1945.

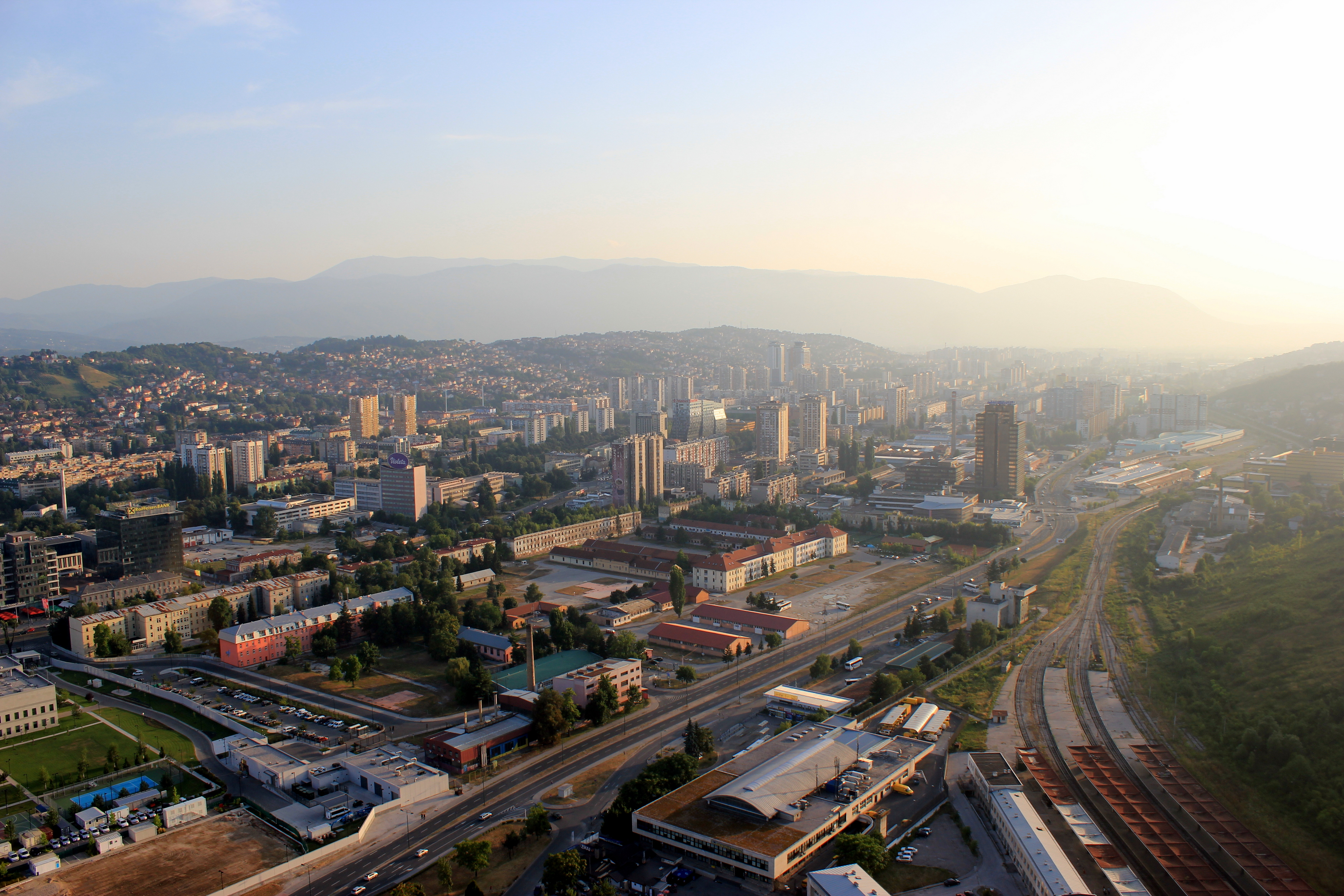
View west toward parts of Novo Sarajevo

After the war, Sarajevo was the capital of the Socialist Republic of Bosnia and Herzegovina within the Socialist Federal Republic of Yugoslavia. The Republic Government invested heavily in Sarajevo, building many new residential blocks in the municipalities of Novi Grad and Novo Sarajevo, while simultaneously developing the city's industry and transforming Sarajevo into a modern city. Sarajevo grew rapidly as it became an important regional industrial center in Yugoslavia. Between the end of the war and the end of Yugoslavia, the city grew from a population of 115,000 to more than 600,000 people. The Vraca Memorial Park, a monument for victims of World War II, was dedicated on 25 November, the "Statehood Day of Bosnia and Herzegovina" when the ZAVNOBIH held their first meeting in 1943.

A crowning moment of Sarajevo's time in Socialist Yugoslavia was the 1984 Winter Olympics. Sarajevo beat out Sapporo, Japan, and Falun/Gothenburg, Sweden, to host the Olympic Games. The games were followed by a tourism boom, making the 1980s one of the city's most prosperous decades.

=== Bosnian War ===
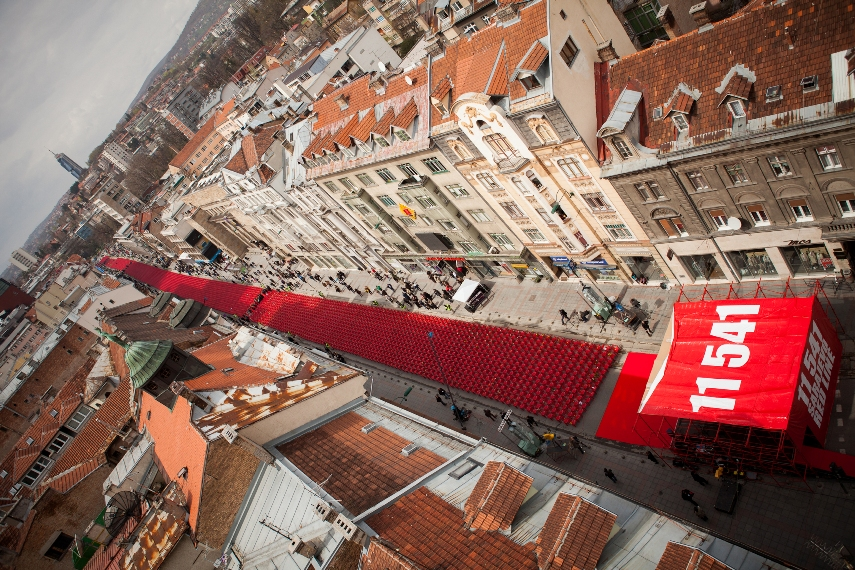
The Sarajevo Red Line, a memorial event of the Siege of Sarajevo's 20th anniversary. 11,541 empty chairs symbolized 11,541 victims of the war who were killed during the Siege

The Bosnian War for independence resulted in large-scale destruction and dramatic population shifts during the Siege of Sarajevo between 1992 and 1996. Thousands of Sarajevans lost their lives under the constant bombardment and sniper shooting at civilians by the Serb forces during the siege, the longest siege of a capital city in the history of modern warfare. Bosnian Serb forces of the Republika Srpska and the Yugoslav People's Army besieged Sarajevo from 5 April 1992 to 29 February 1996.

When Bosnia and Herzegovina declared independence from Yugoslavia and achieved United Nations recognition, Serbian leaders declared a new Serbian national state, Republika Srpska (RS), which was carved out from the territory of Bosnia and Herzegovina. The Army of Republika Srpska encircled Sarajevo with a siege force of 18,000 stationed in the surrounding hills, from which they assaulted the city with artillery, mortars, tanks, anti-aircraft guns, heavy machine guns, multiple rocket launchers, rocket-launched aircraft bombs, and sniper rifles. From 2 May 1992, the Serbs blockaded the city. The Bosnian government defense forces inside the besieged city were poorly equipped and unable to break the siege.

During the siege, 11,541 people were killed, including over 1,500 children. An additional 56,000 people were wounded, including nearly 15,000 children. The 1991 census indicates that before the siege, the city and its surrounding areas had a population of 525,980.

When the siege ended, the concrete scars caused by mortar shell explosions left marks that were filled with red resin. After the red resin was placed, it left floral patterns, which led to them being dubbed Sarajevo Roses. Division of the territory according to the Dayton Agreement resulted in a mass exodus in early 1996 of some 62,000 Sarajevo Serbs from the city and its suburbs, creating today's more monoethnic post-war city.

=== Present ===
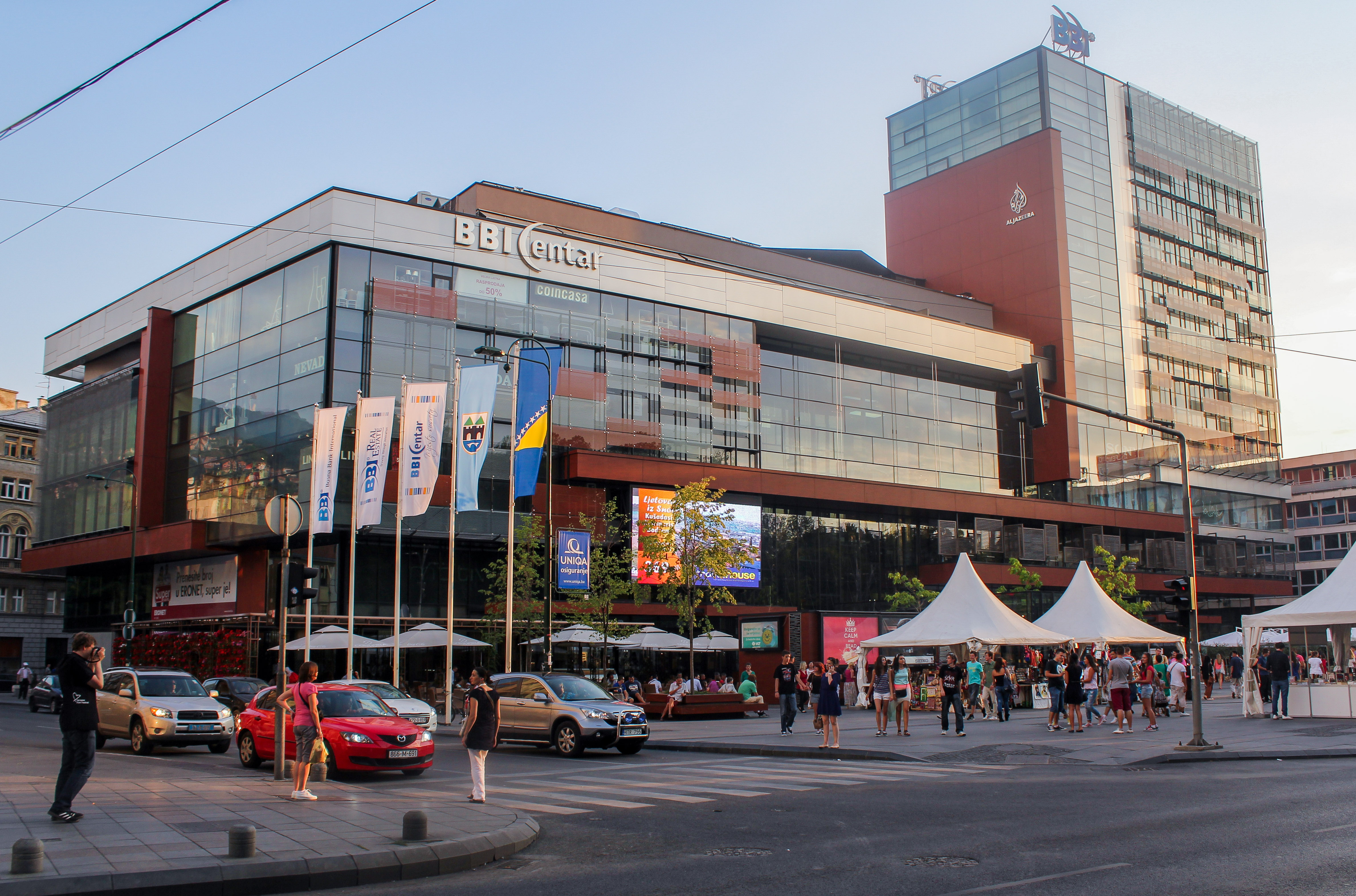
ARIA Centar, erected in 2009

Various modern buildings now occupy Sarajevo's skyline, most significantly the Bosmal City Center, ARIA Centar, Sarajevo City Center (all three by architect Sead Gološ) and the Avaz Twist Tower, which at the time of its building was the tallest skyscraper in former Yugoslavia.

In 2014, the city saw anti-government protests and riots and record rainfall that caused historic flooding. Recent years have seen population growth as well as increases in tourism.

The Sarajevo cable car, also known as the Trebević cable car, Sarajevo's key landmark during the 1984 Winter Olympics, was rebuilt in 2017 and reopened on 6 April 2018. The cable car runs from Sarajevo at Bistrik station to the slopes of Trebević at Vidikovac station.

On 12 February 2026, a tram derailment occurred near the National Museum, killing a 23-year old student and injuring multiple other individuals. The incident sparked multiple large anti-government protest with the protesters demanding accountability and answers for the disaster.

== Administration ==
=== Largest city of Bosnia and Herzegovina ===
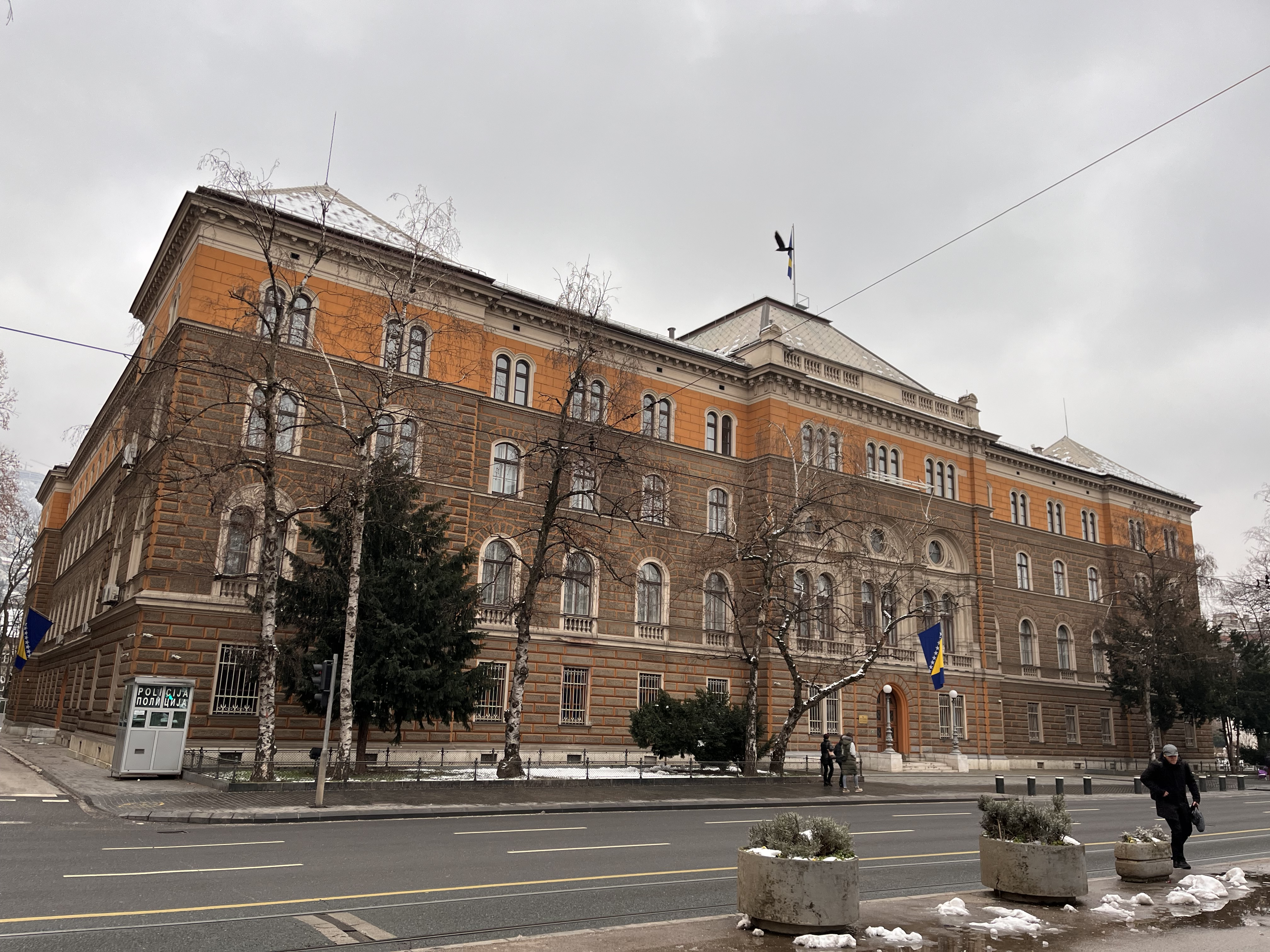
The Building of the Presidency of Bosnia and Herzegovina (left) and Bosnia and Herzegovina's government building (right)

Sarajevo is the capital of the country of Bosnia and Herzegovina and its sub-entity, the Federation of Bosnia and Herzegovina, as well as of the Sarajevo Canton. It is also the de jure capital of another entity, Republika Srpska. Each of these levels of government has its parliament or council, as well as judicial courts, in the city. All national institutions and foreign embassies are in Sarajevo.

Sarajevo is home to the Council of Ministers of Bosnia and Herzegovina, Parliamentary Assembly of Bosnia and Herzegovina, Presidency of Bosnia and Herzegovina, the Constitutional Court of Bosnia and Herzegovina and the operational command of the Armed Forces of Bosnia and Herzegovina.

Bosnia and Herzegovina's Parliament office in Sarajevo was damaged heavily in the Bosnian War. Due to damage, the staff and documents were moved to a nearby ground-level office to resume work. In late 2006, reconstruction work started on Parliament and was finished in 2007. The cost of reconstruction was 80% funded by the Greek Government through the Hellenic Program of Balkans Reconstruction (ESOAV), and 20% by Bosnia and Herzegovina.

=== Municipalities and city government ===
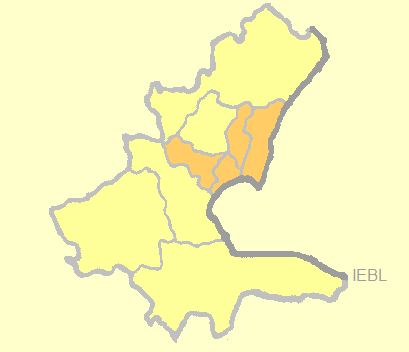
The four municipalities of the City of Sarajevo (Novi Grad, Novo Sarajevo, Centar and Stari Grad) within the territory of Sarajevo Canton

The City of Sarajevo comprises four municipalities: Centar, Novi Grad, Novo Sarajevo, and Stari Grad. Each operates their own municipal government, while united they form one city government with its constitution. The executive branch (Bosnian: Gradska uprava) consists of a mayor, with two deputies and a cabinet.

The legislative branch consists of the City Council, or Gradsko vijeće. The council has 28 members, including a council speaker, two deputies, and a secretary. Councilors are elected by the municipality in numbers roughly proportional to their population. The City Statute requires the city council to include at least six councilors from each constituent people and at least two from the ranks of Others.

Sarajevo's Municipalities are further split into "local communities" (Bosnian, Mjesne zajednice). Local communities have a small role in city government and are intended as a way for ordinary citizens to get involved in city government. They are based on key neighborhoods in the city.

== Economy ==
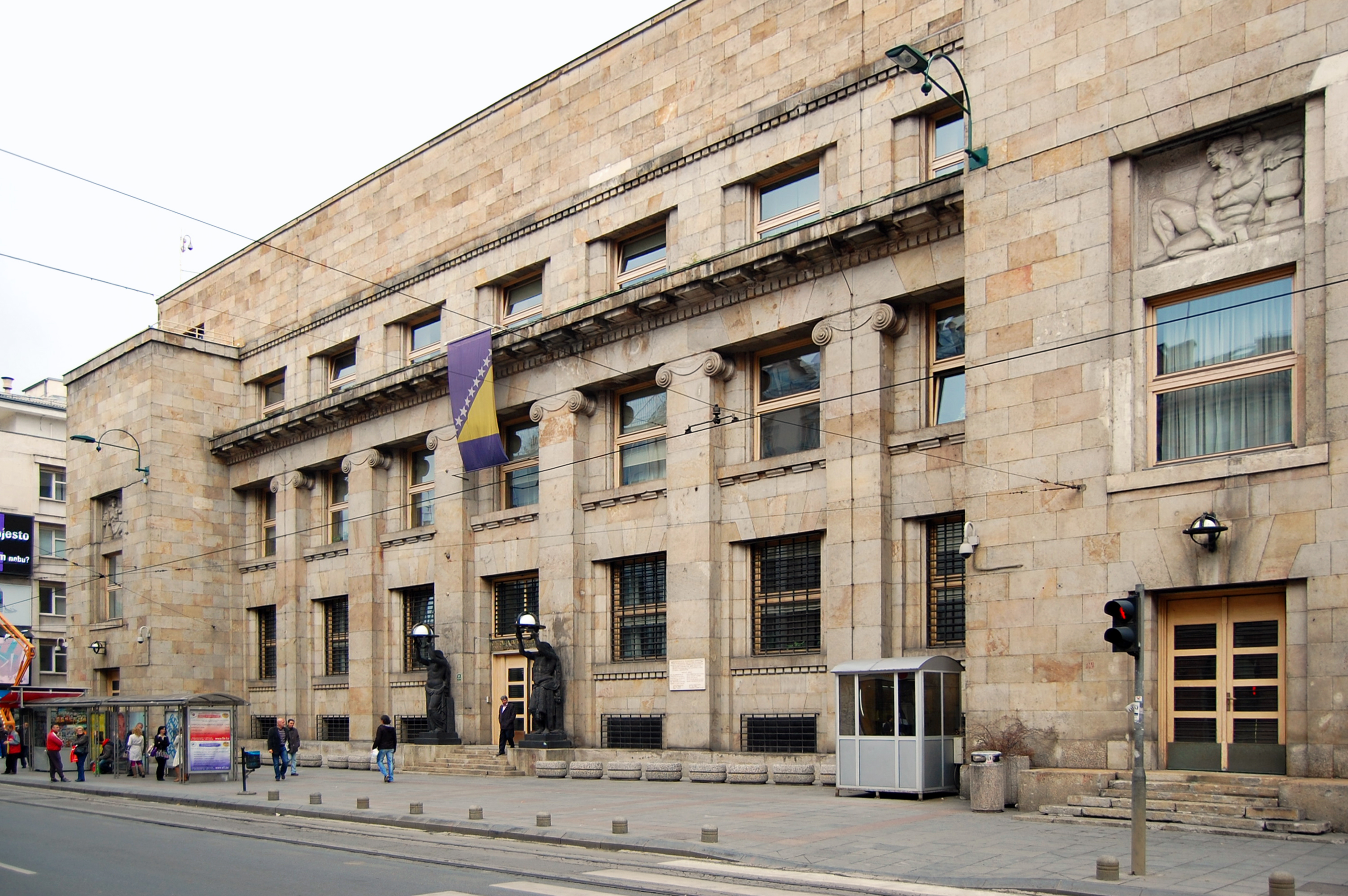
Central Bank of Bosnia and Herzegovina

Sarajevo's large manufacturing, administrative, and tourism sectors make it the strongest economic region of Bosnia and Herzegovina. Sarajevo Canton generates almost 25% of the country's GDP. After years of war, Sarajevo's economy saw reconstruction and rehabilitation programs. The Central Bank of Bosnia and Herzegovina opened in Sarajevo in 1997 and the Sarajevo Stock Exchange began trading in 2002.

While Sarajevo had a large industrial base during its communist period, only a few pre-existing businesses have successfully adapted to the market economy. Sarajevo industries now include tobacco products, furniture, hosiery, automobiles, and communication equipment. Companies based in Sarajevo include BH Telecom, Bosnalijek, Energopetrol, Sarajevo Tobacco Factory, and Sarajevska pivara (Sarajevo Brewery).

In 2019, the total export for the Sarajevo Canton was worth about 1,427,496,000 KM. Most of Sarajevo's exports (20.55%) head to Germany, with Serbia and Croatia following behind at 12% respectively. The largest amount of imported goods comes from Croatia, at 20.95%. With a worth of total import of about 4,872,213,000 KM, the total import is almost 3.4 times the total export.

In 1981, Sarajevo's GDP per capita was 133% of the Yugoslav average. Gross pay in Sarajevo in March 2023 was KM 2,497 or €1,269, while net salary was KM 1,585 or €805, indicating stable growth.

== Tourism and recreation ==
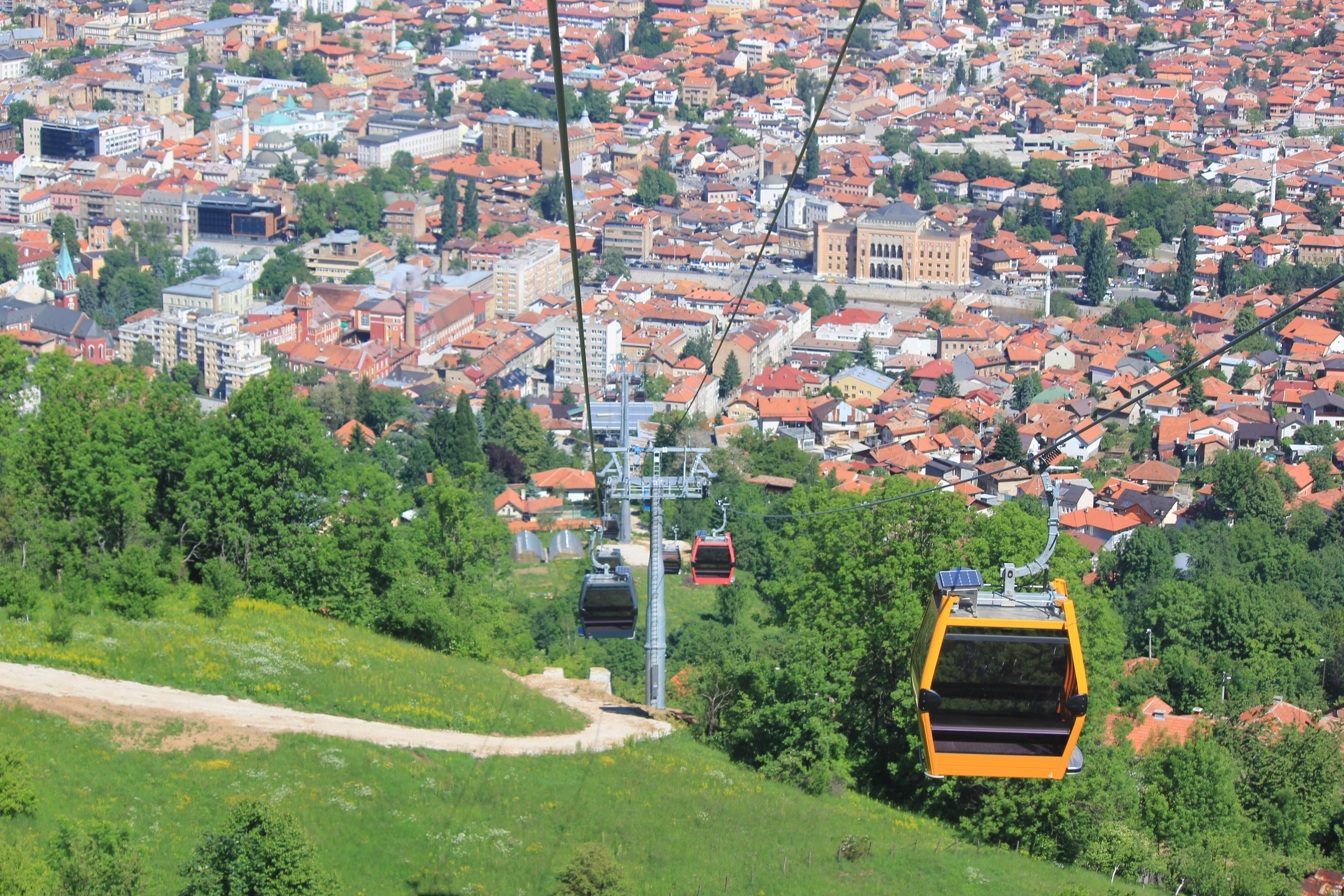
Sarajevo cable car taking visitors to mount Trebević from the city centre

Sarajevo has a wide tourist industry and a fast-expanding service sector thanks to the strong annual growth in tourist arrivals. Sarajevo also benefits from being both a summer and winter destination with continuity in its tourism throughout the year. The travel guide series, Lonely Planet named Sarajevo as the 43rd best city in the world, and in December 2009, listed Sarajevo as one of the top ten cities to visit in 2010.

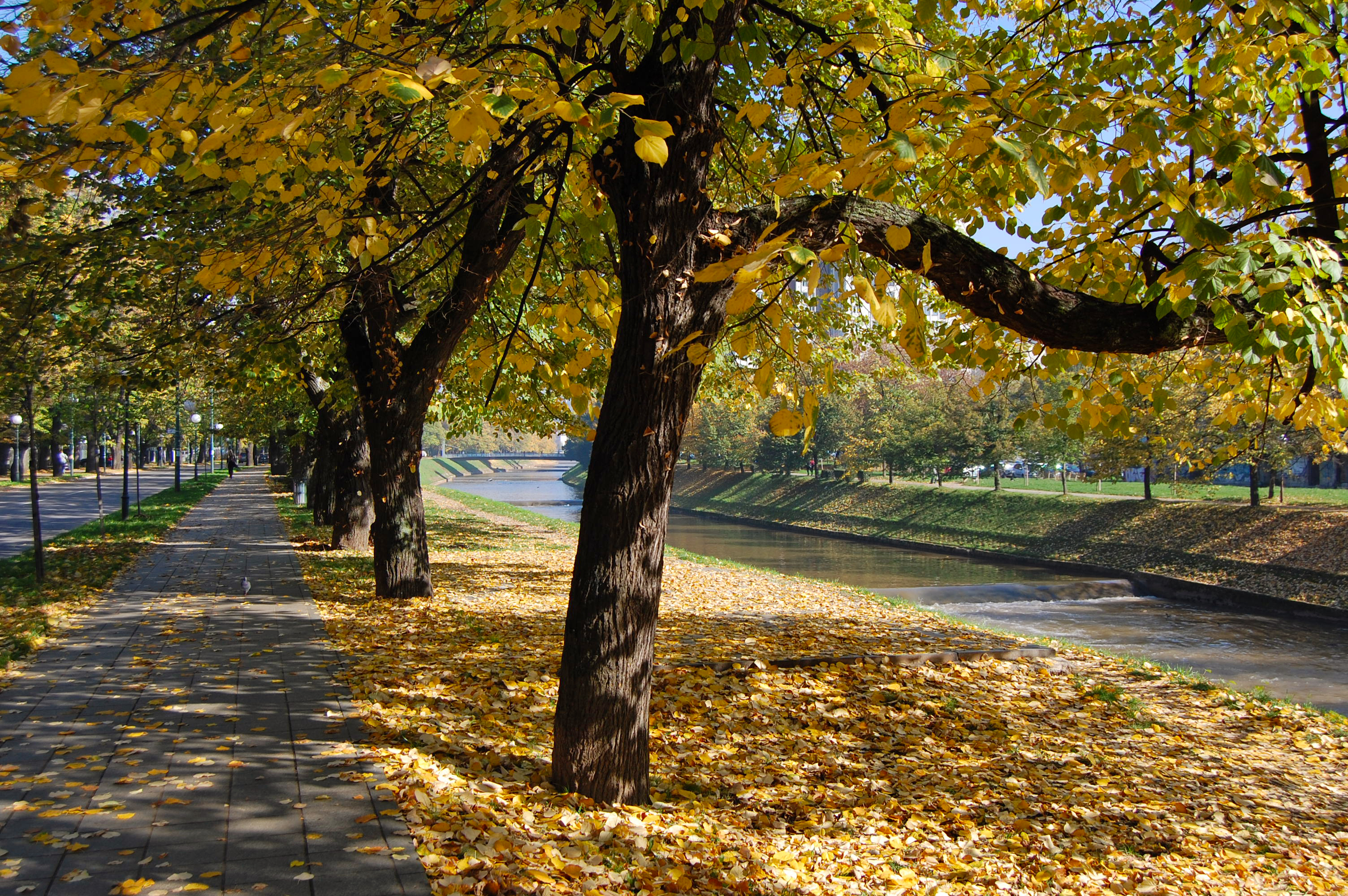
Vilsonovo Šetalište (Wilson's Promenade) along the Miljacka

In 2019, 733,259 tourists visited Sarajevo, giving 1,667,545 overnight stays, which was 20% more than in 2018. Sports-related tourism uses the legacy facilities of the 1984 Winter Olympics, especially the skiing facilities on the nearby mountains of Bjelašnica, Igman, Jahorina, Trebević and Treskavica.

Sarajevo's 600 years of history, influenced by both Western and Eastern empires, makes it a tourist attraction with splendid variations. The city has hosted travellers for centuries, because it was an important trading centre during the Ottoman and Austro-Hungarian empires and because it was a natural stop for many routes between East and West. Examples of popular destinations in Sarajevo include the Vrelo Bosne park, the Sarajevo cathedral, and the Gazi Husrev-beg Mosque. Tourism in Sarajevo is chiefly focused on historical, religious, and cultural sites and winter sports.

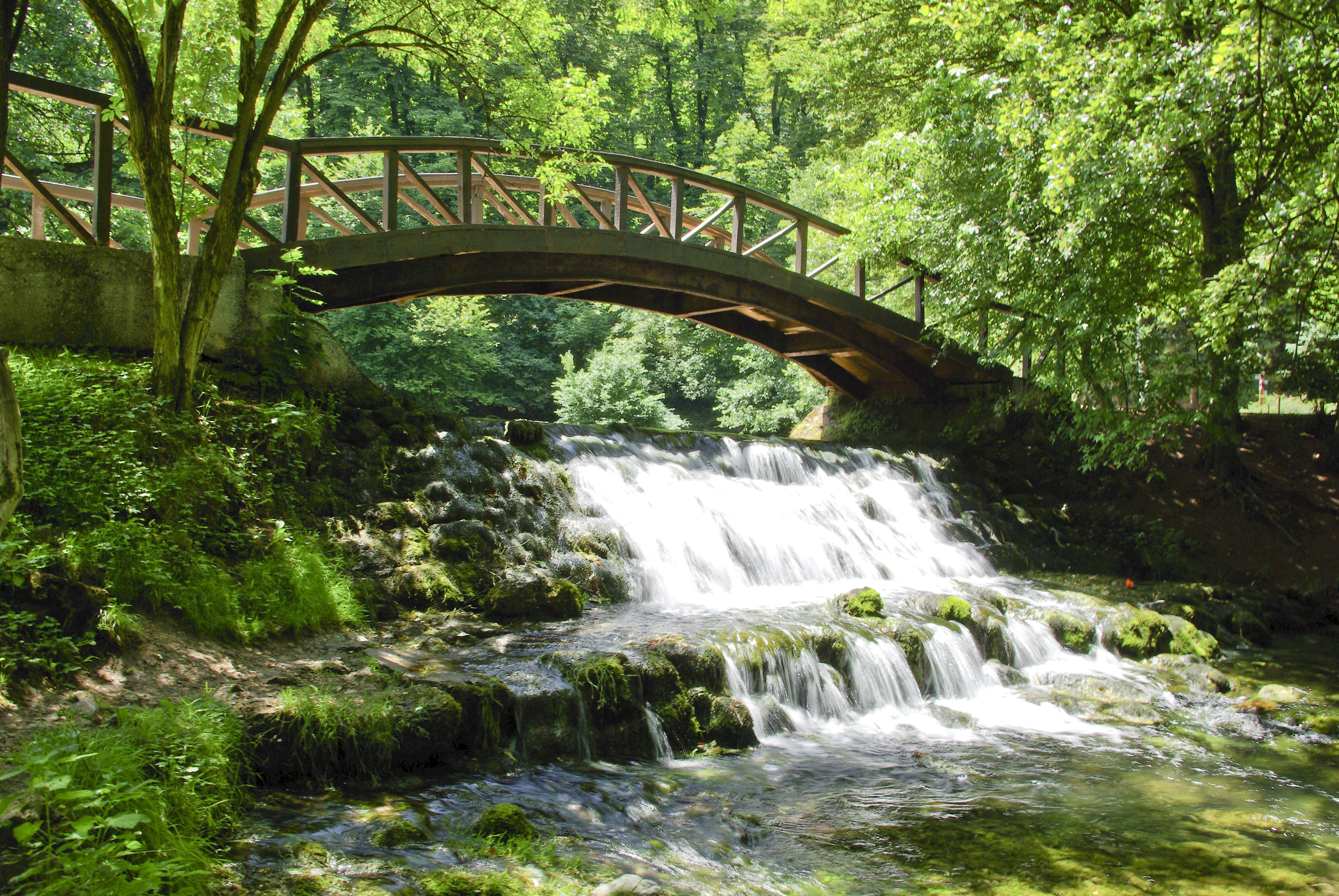
The spring of the Bosna river is located in Ilidža, a chief suburb of Sarajevo

There are many parks throughout the city and on the outskirts. A popular activity among locals is street chess, usually played at Trg Oslobođenja - Alija Izetbegović. Veliki Park is the largest green area in the centre of Sarajevo. It is nestled between Titova, Koševo, Džidžikovac, Tina Ujevića and Trampina Streets and in the lower part, there is a monument dedicated to the Children of Sarajevo. Hastahana is a popular place to relax in the Austro-Hungarian neighborhood of Marijin Dvor. Goat's Bridge, locally known as Kozija Ćuprija, in the Miljacka Canyon is also a popular park destination along the Dariva walkway and river Miljacka. On 24 December 2012, a park hosting two brass sculptures resembling two mourning mothers was dedicated as the Friendship Park, commemorating over 45 years of friendship between Sarajevo and Baku, the capital of Azerbaijan.

Sarajevo is also famous for its city lookouts; including an observation deck on the Avaz Twist Tower, Park Prinčeva restaurant, Vidikovac lookout (Mt. Trebević), Zmajevac lookout and Yellow/White fortresses lookouts (in Vratnik) as well as numerous other rooftops throughout the city (i.e. Alta Shopping Centre, ARIA Centar, Hotel Hecco Deluxe). A symbol of Sarajevo is the Trebević cable car which was reconstructed in 2018, also it is one of the most popular tourist attractions in the city taking visitors from the city centre to Mount Trebević.

There is also a UNESCO tentative monument, the Old Jewish Cemetery, an almost 500 years old site that is the second-largest Jewish sepulchral complex in Europe, the one in Prague being the largest. It is also one of the most significant memorial complexes in the world. It represents the eternal proof of the coexistence of two or more different confessions under different administrations and rules, and the proof of mutual respect and tolerance.

== Demographics ==
Sarajevo has been called the 'European Jerusalem' due to the city's traditionally diverse ethnic and religious makeup

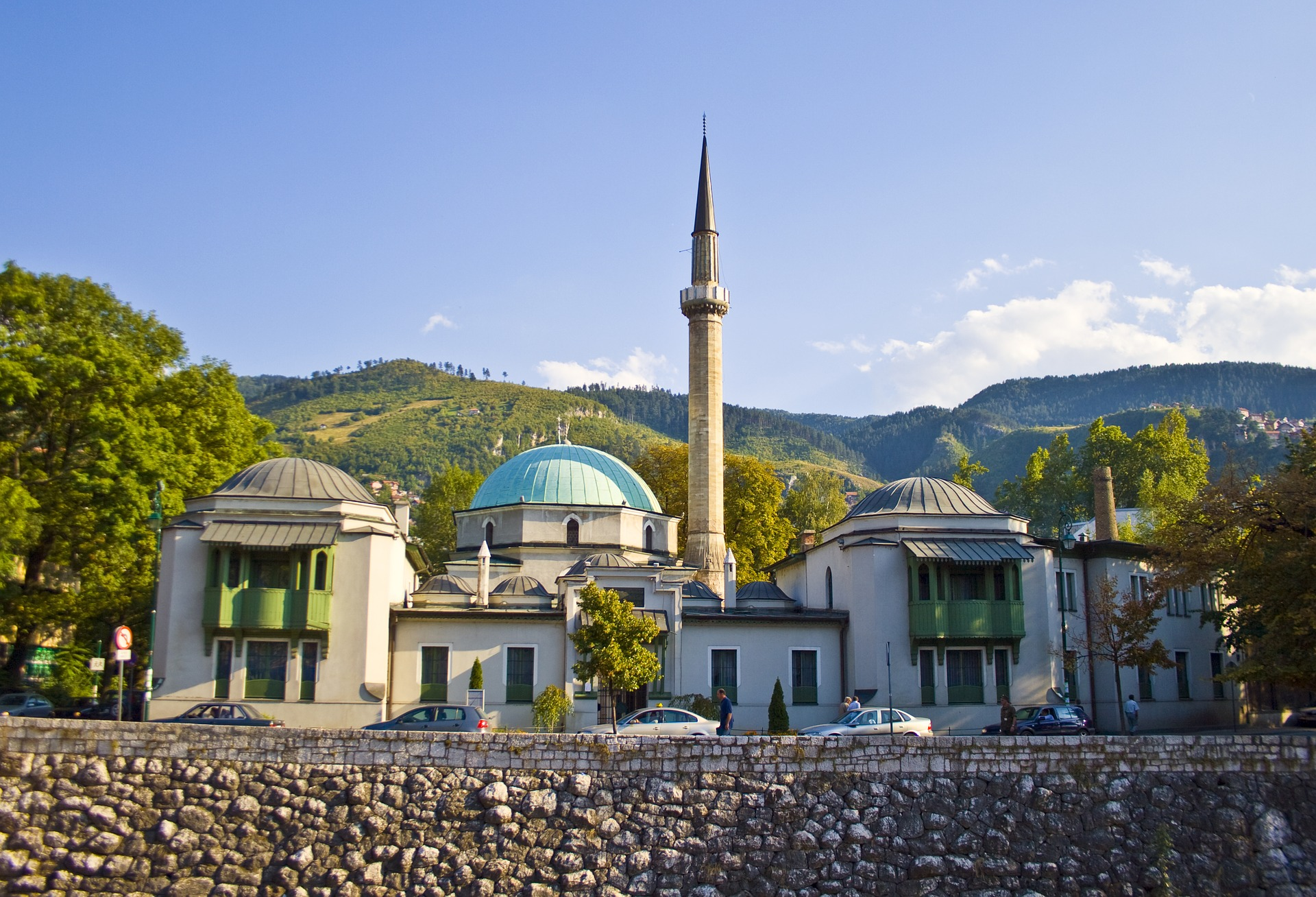
Emperor's Mosque

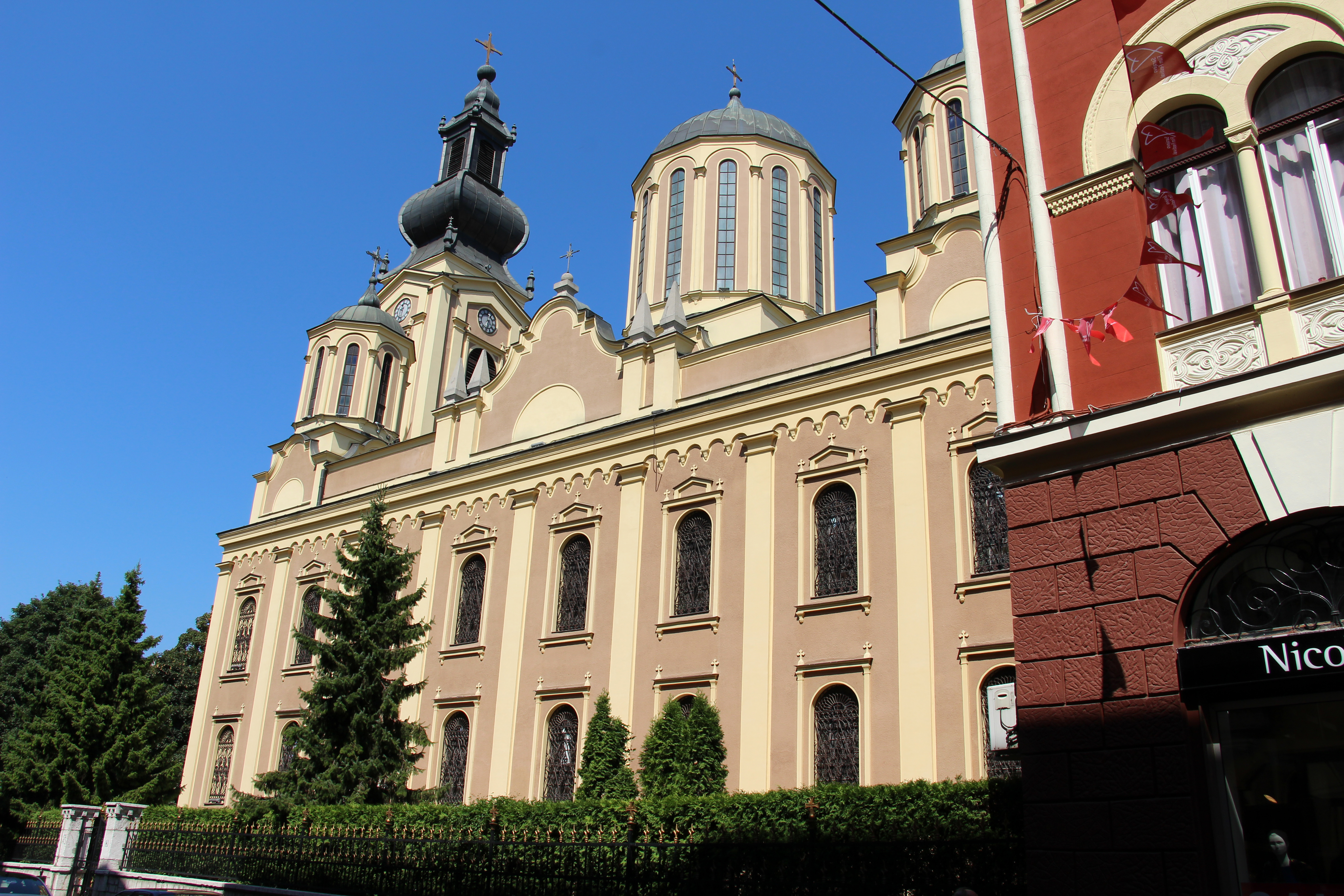
Cathedral of the Nativity of the Theotokos

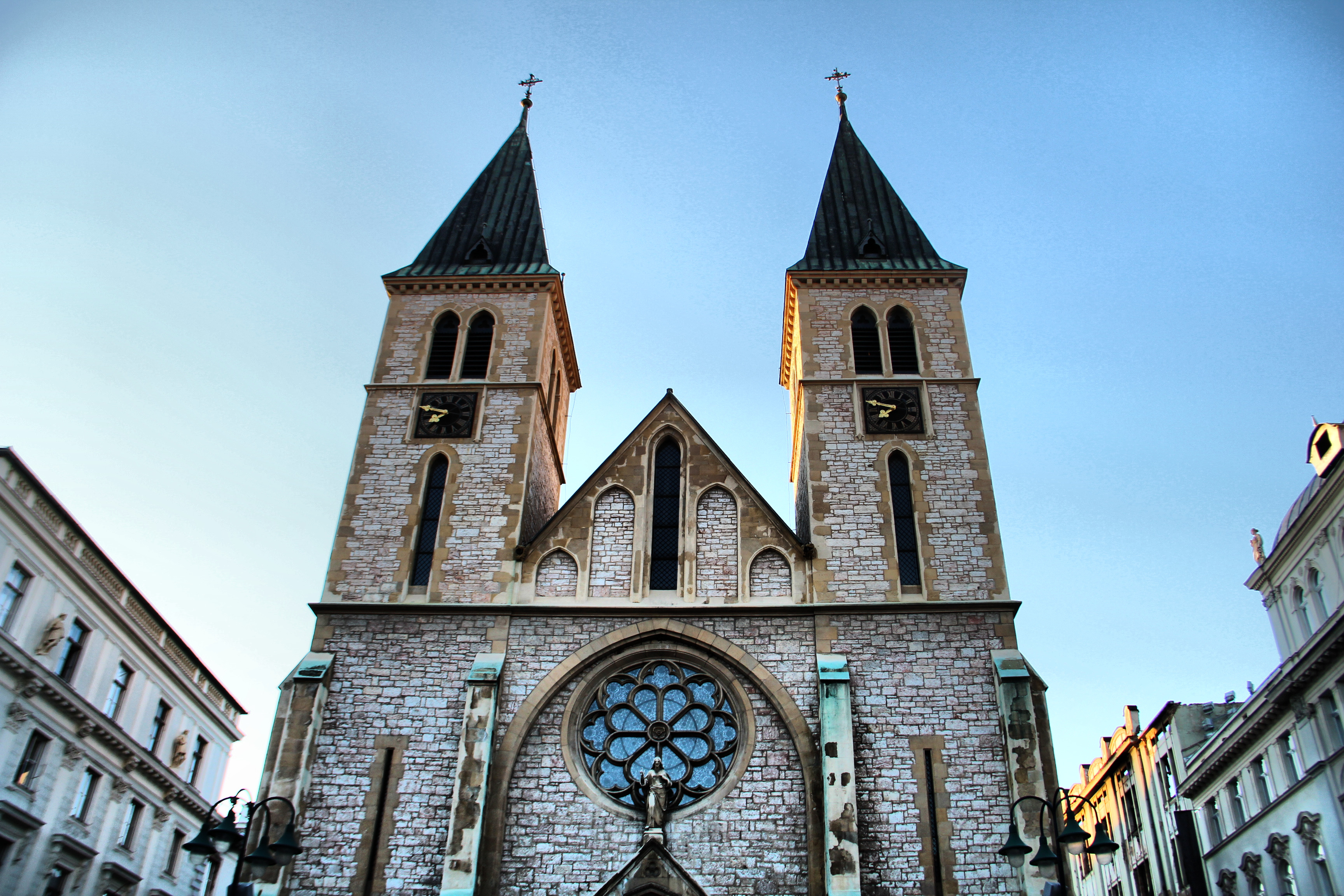
Sacred Heart Cathedral

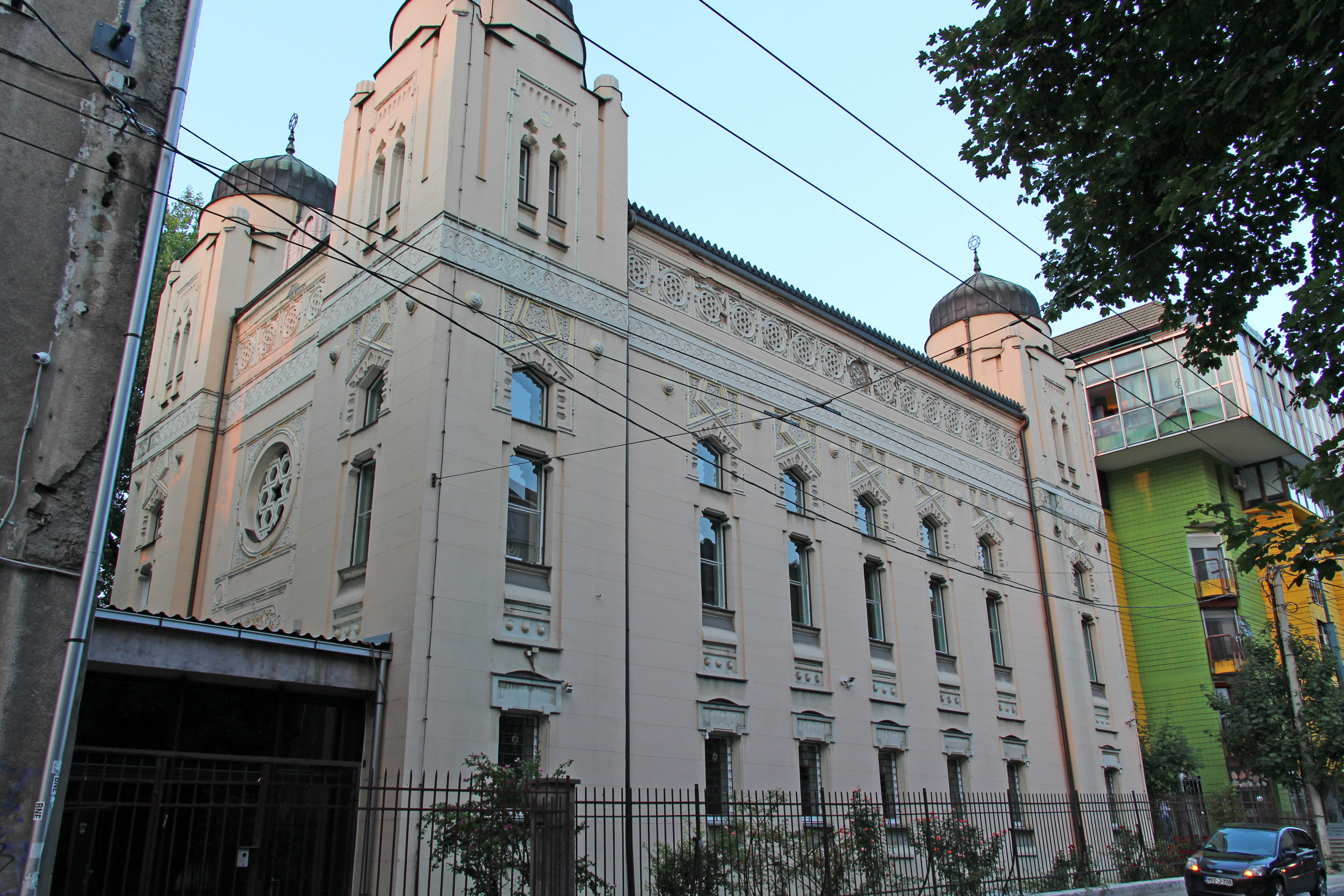
Sarajevo Synagogue

Historical population
Year	Pop.	±%
1660	80,000	—
1851	21,102	−73.6%
1885	26,377	+25.0%
1895	37,713	+43.0%
1910	51,919	+37.7%
1921	66,317	+27.7%
1931	78,173	+17.9%
1953	135,657	+73.5%
1961	213,092	+57.1%
1971	359,448	+68.7%
1981	379,608	+5.6%
1991	492,682	+29.8%
2013	413,593	−16.1%
2022	424,646	+2.7%

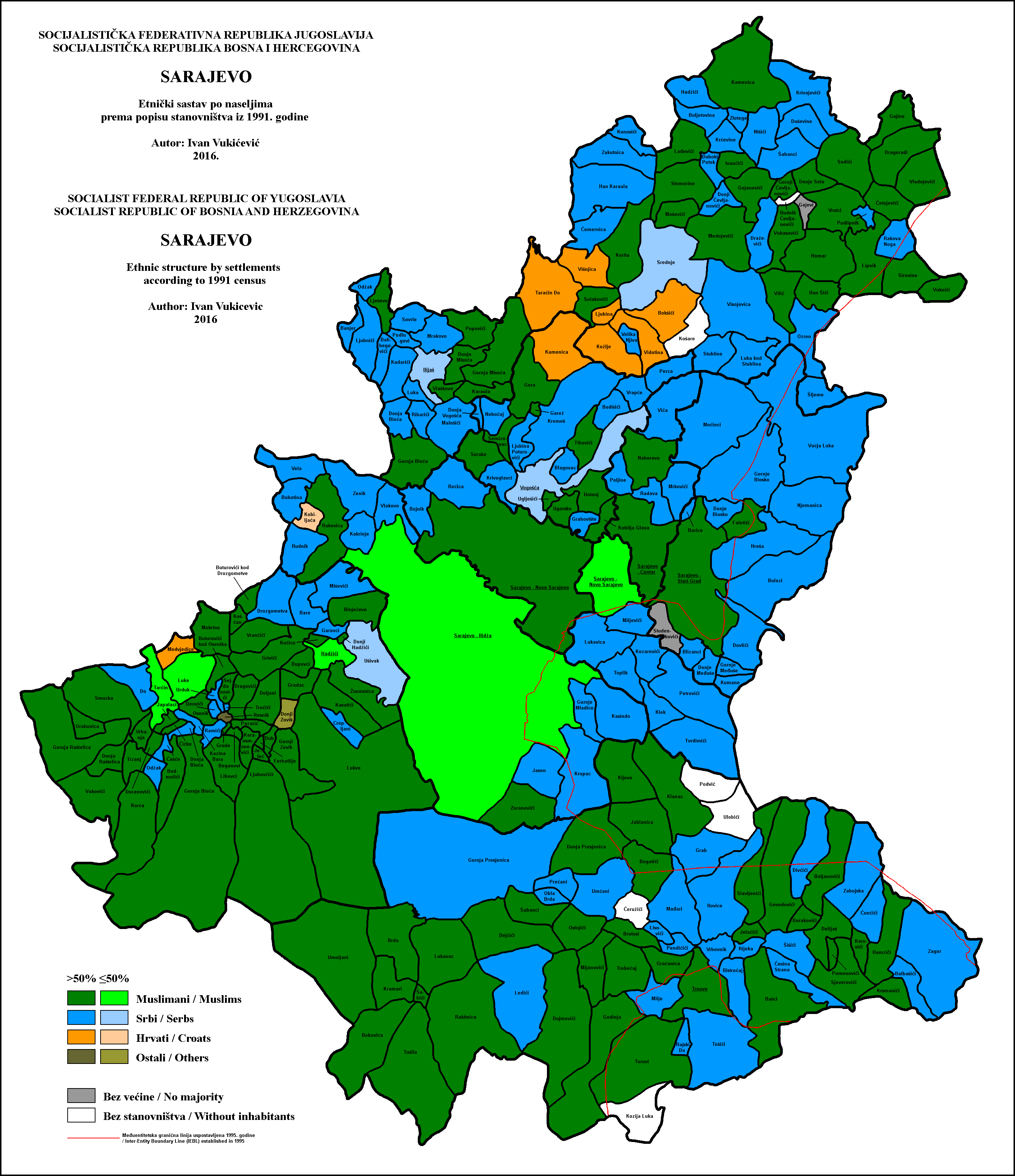
Ethnic structure of Sarajevo by settlements, 1991

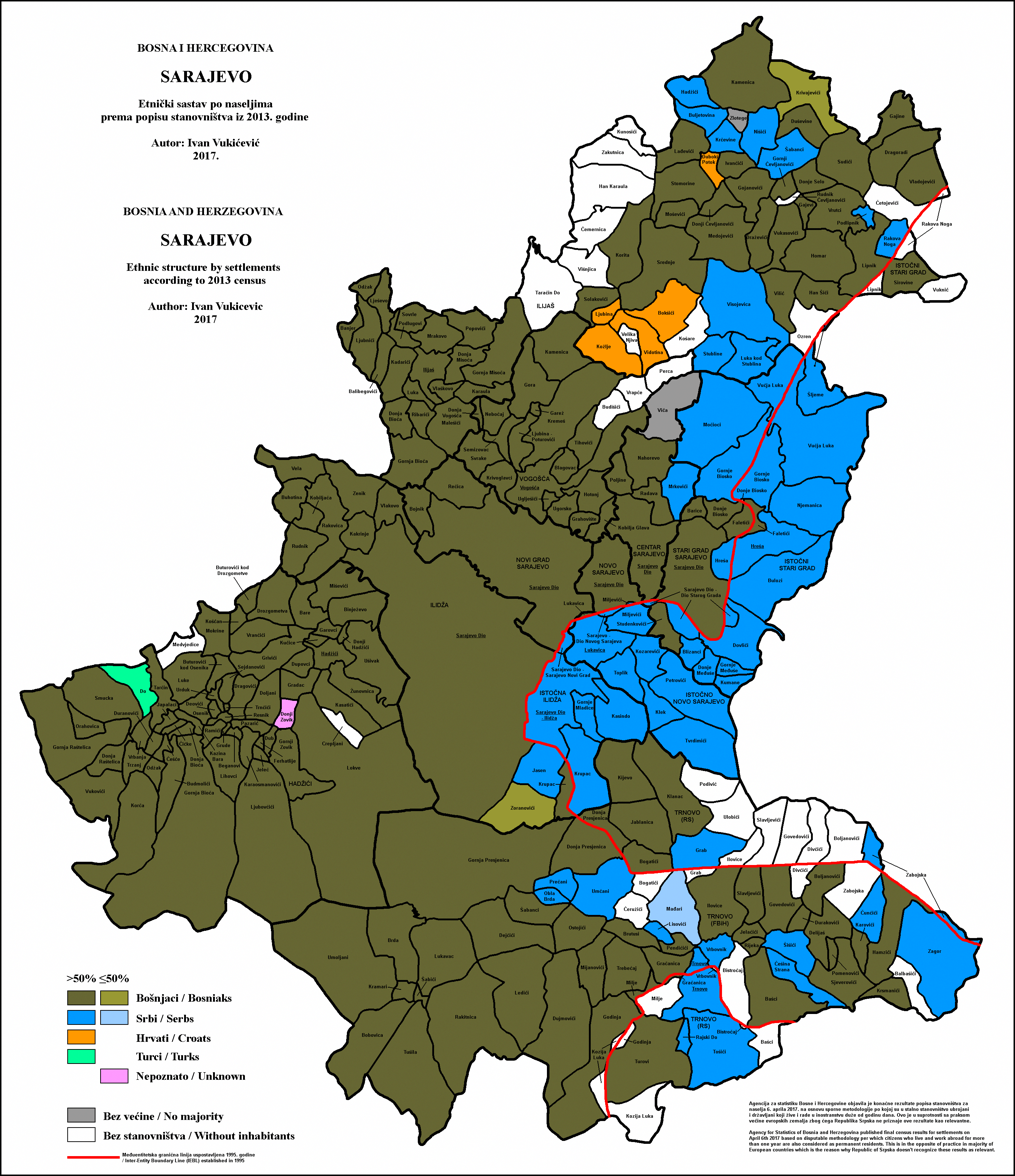
Ethnic structure of Sarajevo by settlements, 2013

Thanks to steady but constant and stable growth after the war, today's built-up area includes not only previously mentioned urban municipalities but the urban part of Hadžići that is uninterruptedly connected to Ilidža, the westernmost part of the Sarajevo urban settlement, is inhabited by more than 419,000 people. It is noticeable that the fastest-growing municipalities are Novi Grad, one of the main ones and the most inhabited one where the population has increased by almost 4,000 people or 2.95% since the 2013 census, and Ilidža that has recorded an increase of almost 7% since 2013.

In June 2016, the final results of the 2013 census were published. According to the census, the population of the Sarajevo Canton was 413,593, with 55,181 residents in Centar, 118,553 in Novi Grad, 64,814 in Novo Sarajevo and 36,976 in Stari Grad.

The last official Yugoslav census took place in 1991 and recorded 527,049 people living in the city of Sarajevo (ten municipalities). In the settlement of Sarajevo proper, there were 454,319 inhabitants. The war displaced hundreds of thousands of people, a large majority of whom have not returned.

The war changed the ethnic and religious profile of the city. It had long been a multicultural city, and often went by the nickname of "Europe's Jerusalem". At the time of the 1991 census, 49.2 percent of the city's population of 527,049 were Bosniaks, 29.8 percent Serbs, 10.7 percent Yugoslavs, 6.6 percent Croats and 3.6 percent other ethnicities (Jews, Romas, etc.).

According to academic Fran Markowitz, there are several "administrative apparatuses and public pressures that push people who might prefer to identify as flexible, multiply constituted hybrids or with one of the now unnamed minority groups into one of the three Bosniac-Croat-Serb constituent nations". These include respondents being encouraged by census interviewers to identify as belonging to one of the three constituent peoples. Her analysis of marriage registration data shows, for instance, that 67 percent of people marrying in 2003 identified as Bosniak or Muslim, which is significantly lower than the 79.6 percent census figure from 2002 (unlike the census, where people respond to an interviewer, applicants to the marriage registry fill in the form themselves).

Ethnic composition of Sarajevo city proper, by municipalities, 2013 census
Municipality	Total	Bosniaks	Serbs	Croats	Others
Centar	55,181	41,702 (75.57%)	2,186 (3.96%)	3,333 (6.04%)	7,960 (14.42%)
Novi Grad	118,553	99,773 (84.16%)	4,367 (3.68%)	4,947 (4.17%)	9,466 (7.98%)
Novo Sarajevo	64,814	48,188 (74.35%)	3,402 (5.25%)	4,639 (7.16%)	8,585 (13.24%)
Stari Grad	36,976	32,794 (88.69%)	467 (1.3%)	685 (1.85%)	3,030 (8.19%)
Total	275,524	222,457 (80.74%)	10,422 (3.78%)	13,604 (4.94%)	29,041 (10.54%)

== Transportation ==
=== Roads and highways ===
Sarajevo's location in a valley between mountains makes it a compact city. Narrow city streets and a lack of parking areas restrict automobile traffic but allow better pedestrian and cyclist mobility. The two main roads are Titova Ulica (Street of Marshal Tito) and the east–west Zmaj od Bosne (Dragon of Bosnia) highway (E761). Located roughly at the center of the country, Sarajevo is Bosnia's main intersection. The city is connected to all the other major cities by highway or national road like Zenica, Banja Luka, Tuzla, Mostar, Goražde and Foča.

Tourists from Central Europe and elsewhere visiting Dalmatia driving via Budapest through Sarajevo also contribute to the traffic congestion in and around Sarajevo. The trans-European highway, Corridor Vc, runs through Sarajevo connecting it to Budapest in the north, and Ploče at the Adriatic Sea in the south. The highway is being built by the government and should cost 3.5 billion Euro. Up until March 2012, the Federation of Bosnia and Herzegovina invested around 600 million euros in the A1. In 2014, the sections Sarajevo-Zenica and Sarajevo-Tarčin were completed including the Sarajevo Beltway ring road.

=== Tram, bus and trolleybus ===
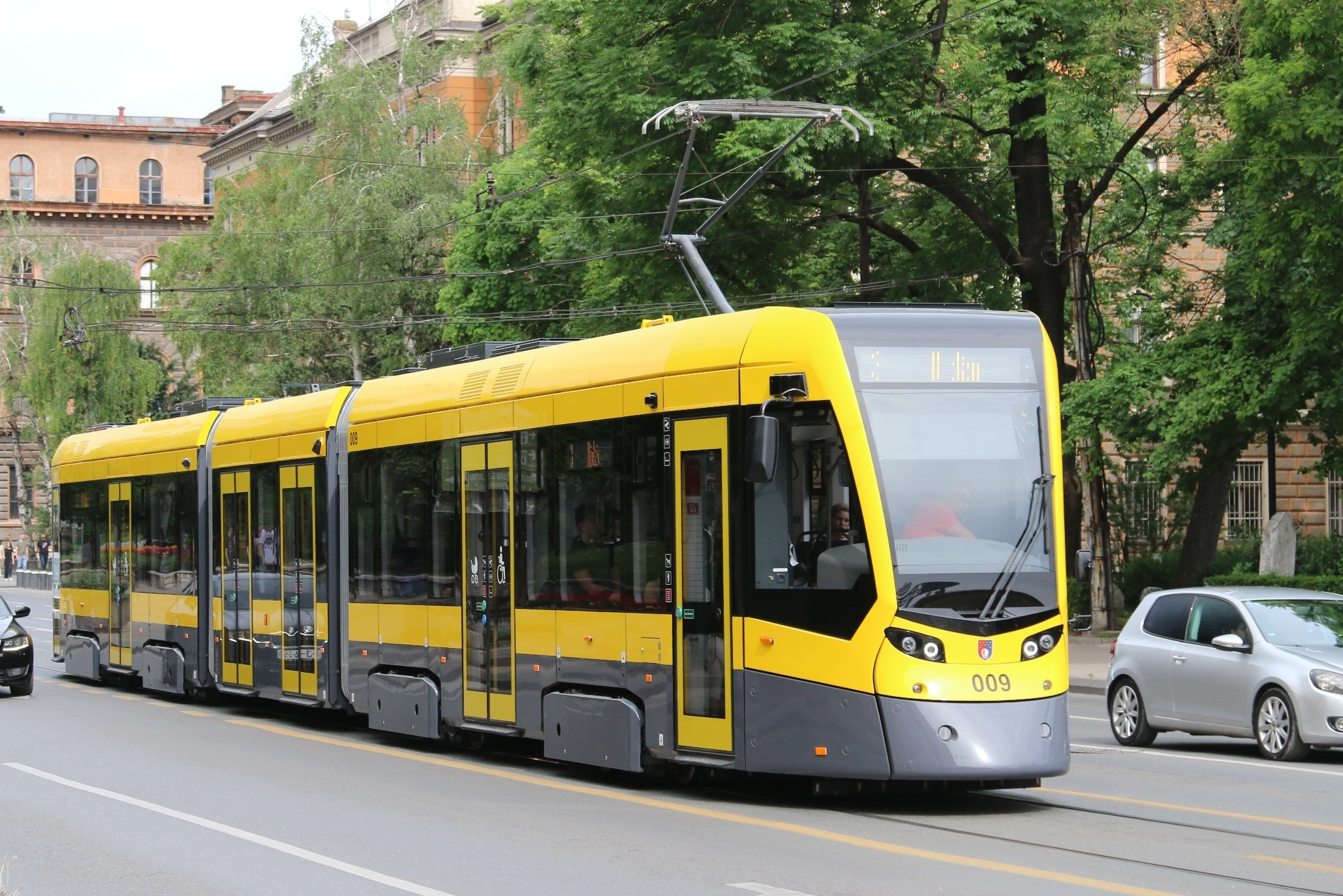
Sarajevo tram

Sarajevo's electric tramways, in operation since 1884 and electrified since 1895, are the oldest form of public transportation in the city. Sarajevo had the first full-time (dawn to dusk) tram line in Europe, and the second in the world. Opened on New Year's Day in 1885, it was the testing line for the tram in Vienna and the Austro-Hungarian Empire, and operated by horses. Originally built to 760 mm (2 ft 5 15/16 in) Bosnian gauge, the present system in 1960 was upgraded to 1,435 mm (4 ft 8 1/2 in) standard gauge. The trams played a pivotal role in the growth of the city in the 20th century.

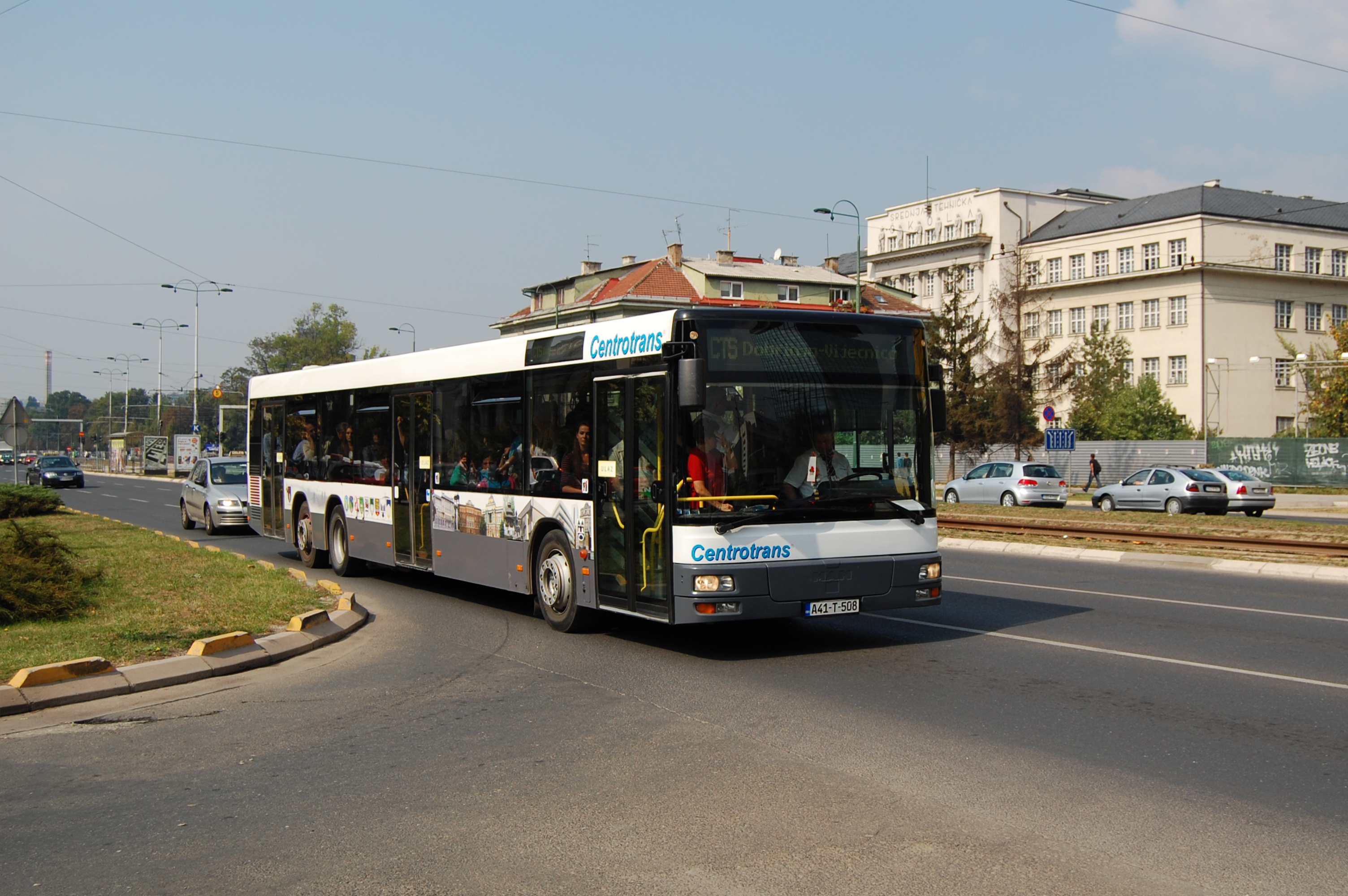
MAN Centrotrans bus

There are seven tramway lines supplemented by five trolleybus lines and numerous bus routes. The main railway station in Sarajevo is in the north-central area of the city. From there, the tracks head west before branching off in different directions, including to industrial zones in the city. Sarajevo is undergoing a major infrastructure renewal; many highways and streets are being repaved, the tram system is undergoing modernization, and new bridges and roads are under construction. In January 2021, the city bought 25 new BKM 433 trolleybuses. Tram track renovation lasted from August 2021 to September 2023. The city also bought 15 new Stadler Tango trams in September 2021. The first tram arrived in December 2023, while the rest are expected to arrive by the summer of 2024. An additional 10 new trams were bought, as well as 30 new buses. The latest tram line to be opened is the line leading to Hrasnica on September 27, 2026 with the line number being 11, a reference to the shirt number worn by the Bosnian football star Edin Džeko.

=== Railway ===
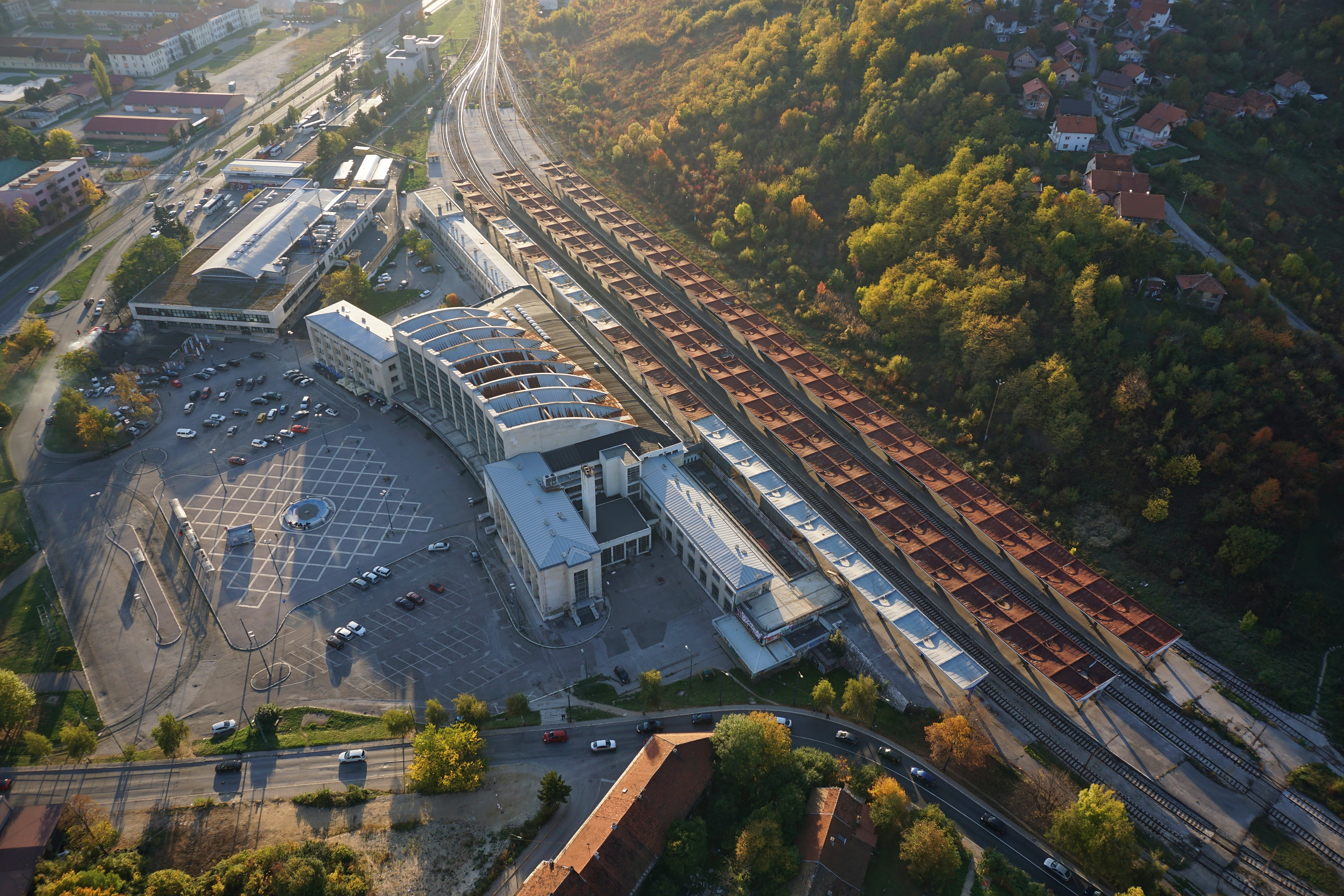
Sarajevo main railway station

The Sarajevo main railway station was built in 1882 for the narrow-gauge railway. After World War II, it was decided to replace the old station by a new functionalist building. The ceremonial completion of the station building took place in 1949. The station was electrified in 1967, as part of the early electrification program introduced in Bosnia up to 1969.

The Sarajevo–Ploče railway provides a connection to the Adriatic coast. It holds the distinction of being the first 25 kV AC-electrified country in the former Yugoslavia, followed by Croatia and Serbia. Once, the East Bosnian railway connected Sarajevo to Belgrade.

==== Metro plans ====
To solve traffic congestion in the city, Sarajevo-based architect Muzafer Osmanagić proposed a study called "Eco Energy 2010–2015", proposing a subway system underneath the bed of the river Miljacka. The first line of Metro Sarajevo would connect Baščaršija with Otoka. This line would cost some 150 million KM and be financed by the European Bank for Reconstruction and Development.

=== Airport ===
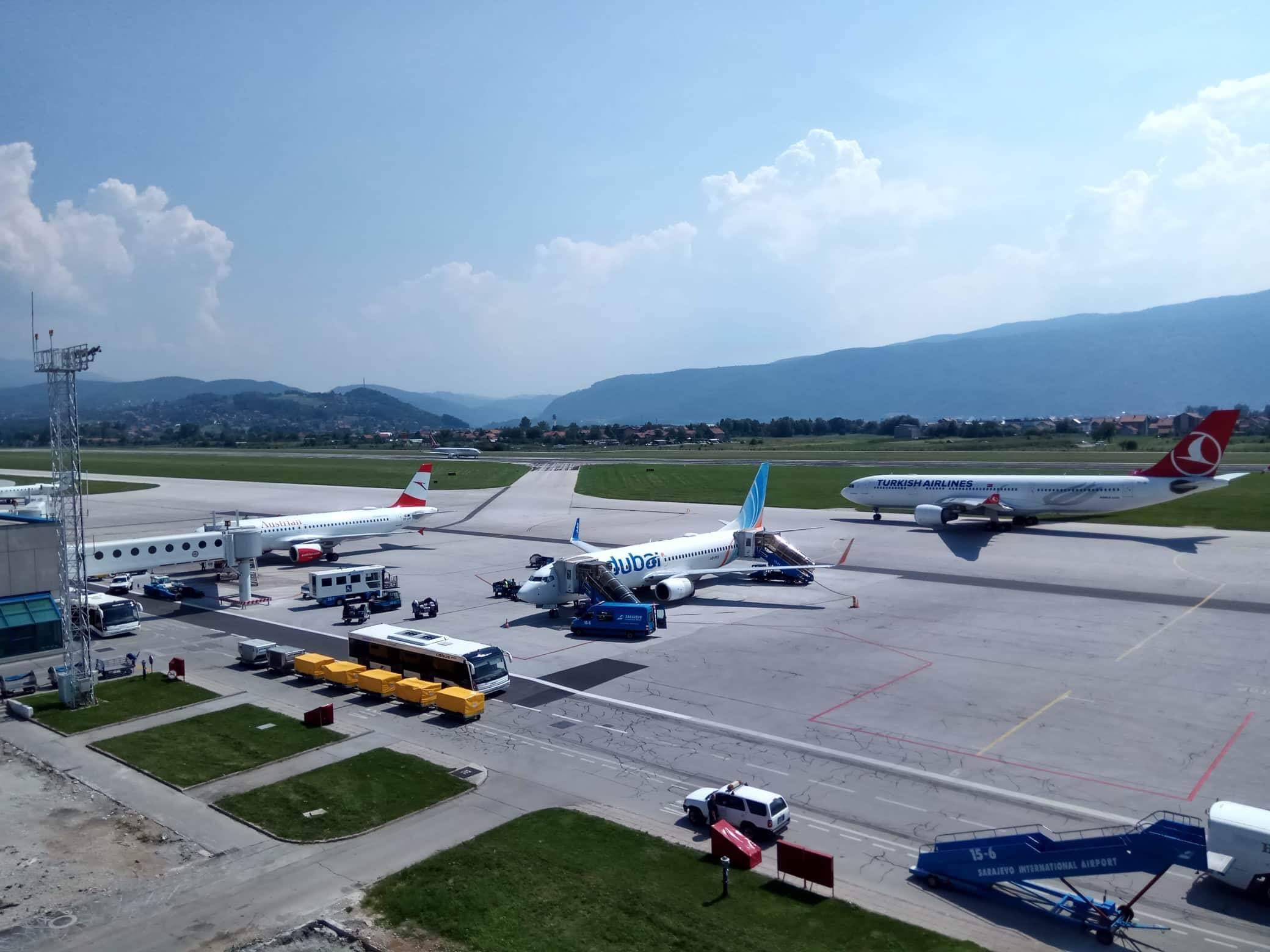
Sarajevo International Airport

Sarajevo International Airport (IATA: SJJ) is just a few kilometers southwest of the city and was voted Best European Airport With Under 1,000,000 Passengers at the 15th Annual ACI-Europe in Munich in 2005.

The first regular flights to Sarajevo using an airfield in the suburb of Butmir began in 1930 when the domestic airliner Aeroput opened a regular route linking Belgrade to Podgorica through Sarajevo. Later, Aeroput opened a route that linked Sarajevo with Split, Rijeka, and Dubrovnik, and in 1938, the first international flights were introduced when Aeroput extended the route Dubrovnik – Sarajevo – Zagreb to Vienna, Brno and Prague. The airfield in Butmir remained in use until 1969.

The need for a new airport in Sarajevo, with an asphalt-concrete runway, was acknowledged in the mid-1960s when JAT, the Yugoslav national carrier at that time, began acquiring jet planes. The construction of the airport began in 1966 at its present location, not far from the old one.

Sarajevo Airport opened on 2 June 1969 for domestic traffic. In 1970, Frankfurt became the first international destination served. Most of the time the airport was a 'feeder' airport where passengers embarked for flights to Zagreb and Belgrade on their way to international destinations. Over time, the traffic volume steadily grew from 70,000 to 600,000 passengers a year. Later, during the Bosnian War, the airport was used for UN flights and humanitarian relief. Since the Dayton Agreement in 1995, the airport retook its role as the main air portal to Bosnia and Herzegovina.

In 2017, 957,971 passengers travelled through the airport, which was 61,4% of the total airport traffic in Bosnia and Herzegovina.

Plans for the extension of the passenger terminal, together with upgrading and expanding the taxiway and apron, started in the fall of 2012. The existing terminal was expanded by approximately 7,000 m^{2} (75,347 sq ft). The upgraded airport was directly linked to the commercial retail center Sarajevo Airport Center, making it easier for tourists and travelers to spend their time before flight boarding shopping and enjoying the many amenities that are offered. Between 2015 and 2018, the airport was upgraded for more than 25 million euros.

== Communications and media ==
The Avaz Twist Tower, headquarters for the newspaper Dnevni avaz

As the largest city of Bosnia and Herzegovina, Sarajevo is the main center of the country's media. Most of the communications and media infrastructure was destroyed during the war but reconstruction monitored by the Office of the High Representative has helped to modernize the industry as a whole. For example, the Internet was first made available to the city in 1995.

Oslobođenje (Liberation), founded in 1943, is Sarajevo's longest-running continuously circulating newspaper and the only one to survive the war. However, this long-running and trusted newspaper has fallen behind Dnevni avaz (Daily Voice), founded in 1995, and Jutarnje Novine (Morning News) in circulation in Sarajevo. Other local periodicals include the Croatian newspaper Hrvatska riječ and the Bosnian magazine Start, as well as weekly newspapers Slobodna Bosna (Free Bosnia) and BH Dani (BH Days). Novi Plamen, a monthly magazine, is the most left-wing publication.

The Radio and Television of Bosnia and Herzegovina (BHRT) is Sarajevo's public television station and was created in 1945 under the umbrella of the Yugoslav Radio Television (JRT). It had its first television program aired in 1961, while continuous programming started in 1969. It is one of three main TV stations in Bosnia and Herzegovina. Other stations based in the city include Hayat TV, O Kanal, OBN, TV Kantona Sarajevo and TV Alfa.

The headquarters of Al Jazeera Balkans is also in Sarajevo, with a broadcasting studio at the top of the ARIA Centar. The news channel covers Bosnia and Herzegovina, Serbia, Croatia and Montenegro and the surrounding Balkan states.

Many small independent radio stations exist, including established stations such as Radio M, RSG Radio (Radio Old Town), Studentski eFM Radio, Radio 202 and Radio BIR. Radio Free Europe, as well as several American and Western European stations are available.

== Education ==
=== Higher education ===
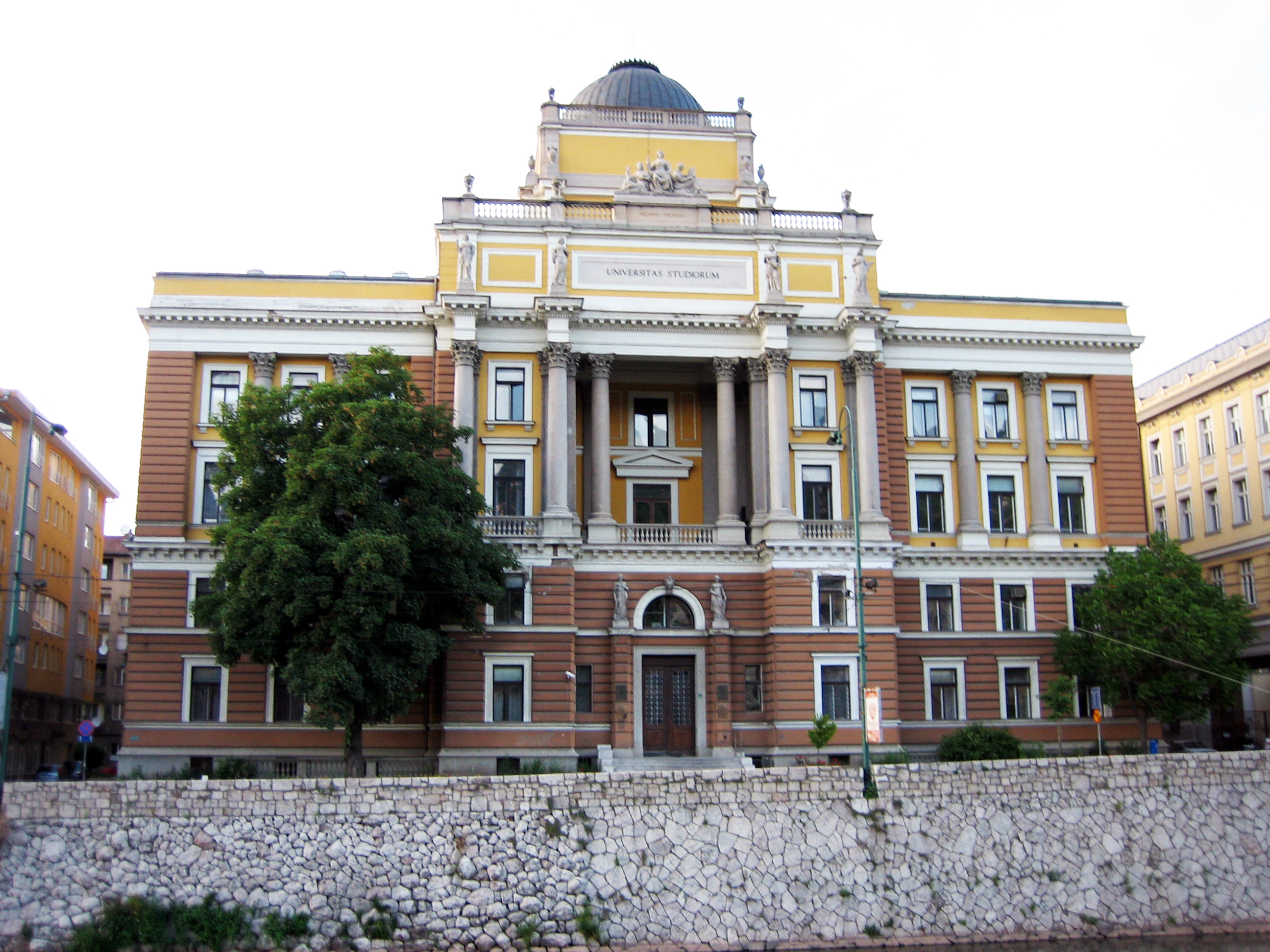
Rectorate and the Faculty of Law, University of Sarajevo

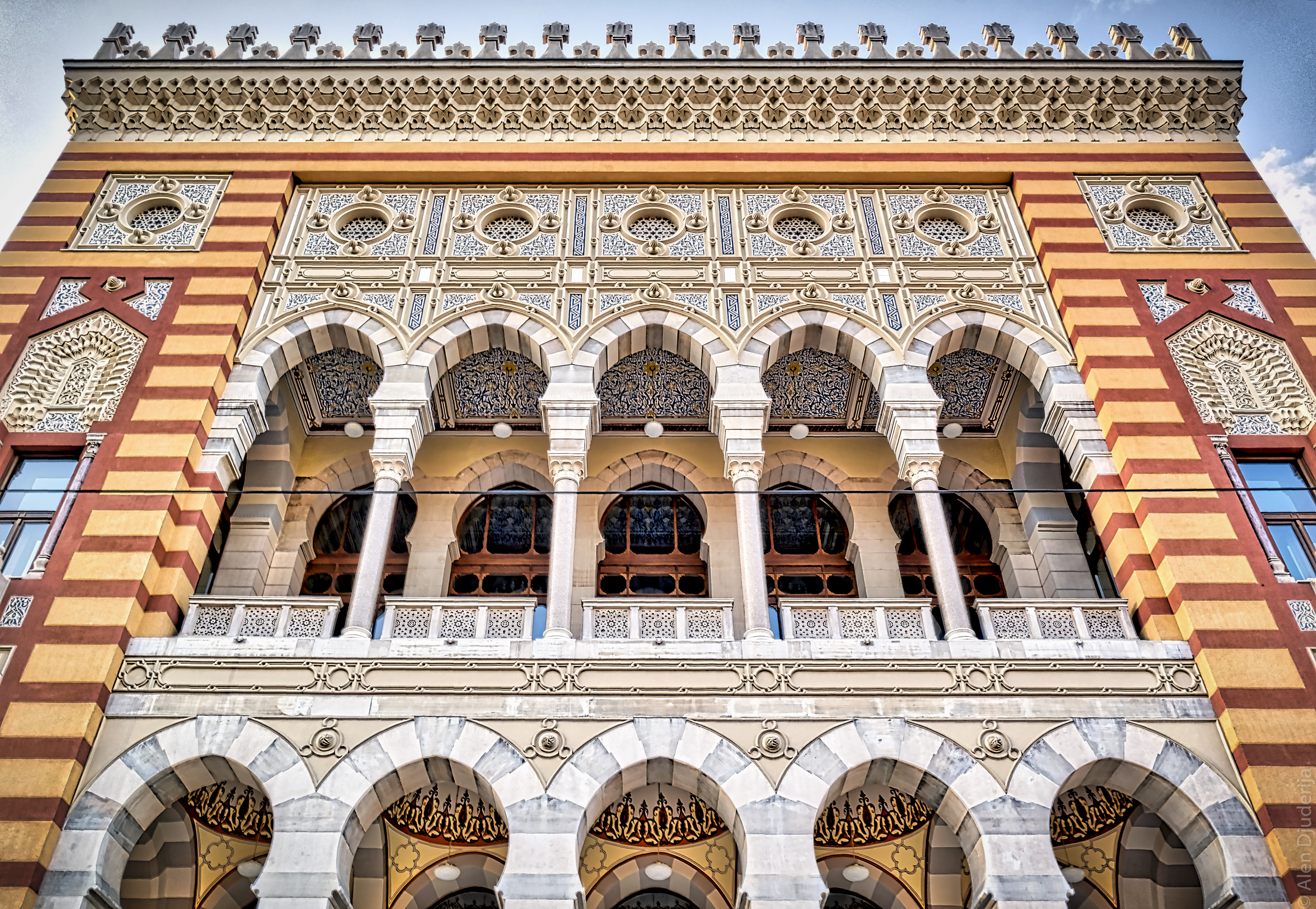
National and University Library of Bosnia and Herzegovina

Higher education has a long and rich tradition in Sarajevo. The first institution that can be classified as a tertiary educational institution was a school of Sufi philosophy established by Gazi Husrev-beg in 1537; numerous other religious schools have been established over time. In 1887, under the Austro-Hungarian Empire, a Sharia Law School began a five-year program. In the 1940s, the University of Sarajevo became the city's first secular higher education institute, effectively building upon the foundations established by the Saraybosna Hanıka in 1537. In the 1950s, post-bachelor graduate degrees became available. Severely damaged during the war, it was recently rebuilt in partnership with more than 40 other universities.

There are also several universities in Sarajevo, including:

- University of Sarajevo
- Sarajevo School of Science and Technology
- International University of Sarajevo
- Sarajevo Graduate School of Business
- International Burch University

=== Primary and secondary education ===
As of 2005, there are 46 elementary schools (Grades 1–9) and 33 high schools (Grades 10–13) in Sarajevo, including three schools for children with special needs.

There are also several international schools in Sarajevo, catering to the expatriate community; some of which are Sarajevo International School and the French International School of Sarajevo, established in 1998.

== Culture ==
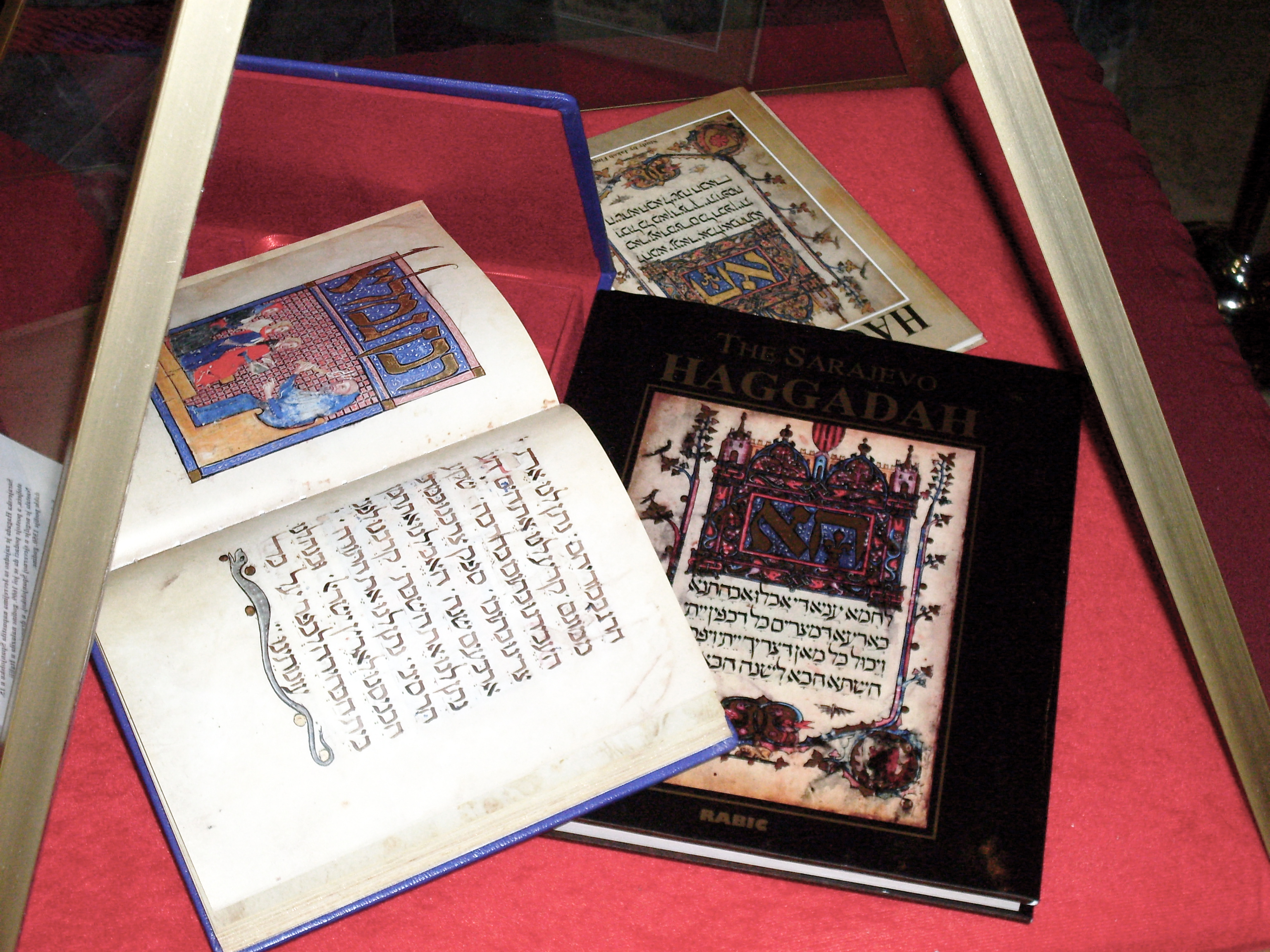
Copies of the Sarajevo Haggadah

Sarajevo has been home to many different religions for centuries, giving the city a range of diverse cultures. In the time of Ottoman occupation of Bosnia, Muslims, Orthodox Christians, Roman Catholics, and Sephardi Jews all shared the city while maintaining distinctive identities. They were joined during the brief occupation by Austria-Hungary by a smaller number of Germans, Hungarians, Slovaks, Czechs and Ashkenazi Jews. By 1909, about 50% of the city's inhabitants were Muslim, 25% were Catholic, 15% were Orthodox, and 10% were Jewish.

Historically, Sarajevo has been home to several prominent Bosnian poets, scholars, philosophers, and writers. To list only a very few; Nobel Prize-winner Vladimir Prelog is from the city, as are the writer Zlatko Topčić and the poet Abdulah Sidran. Nobel Prize-winner Ivo Andrić attended high school in Sarajevo for two years. Academy Award-winning director Danis Tanović lives in the city.

The Sarajevo National Theatre is the oldest professional theater in Bosnia and Herzegovina, having been established in 1921. In 2019, Sarajevo was designated as a City of Film by UNESCO.

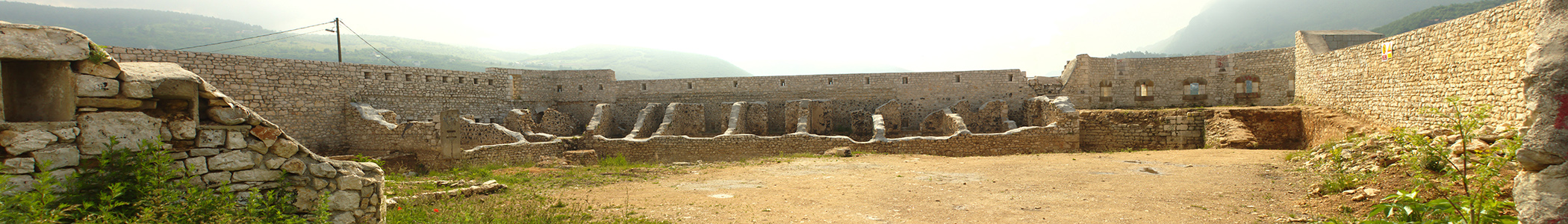
A panoramic view of the ruined castle of Bijela Tabija "White Bastion" in the very east of Sarajevo

=== Museums ===
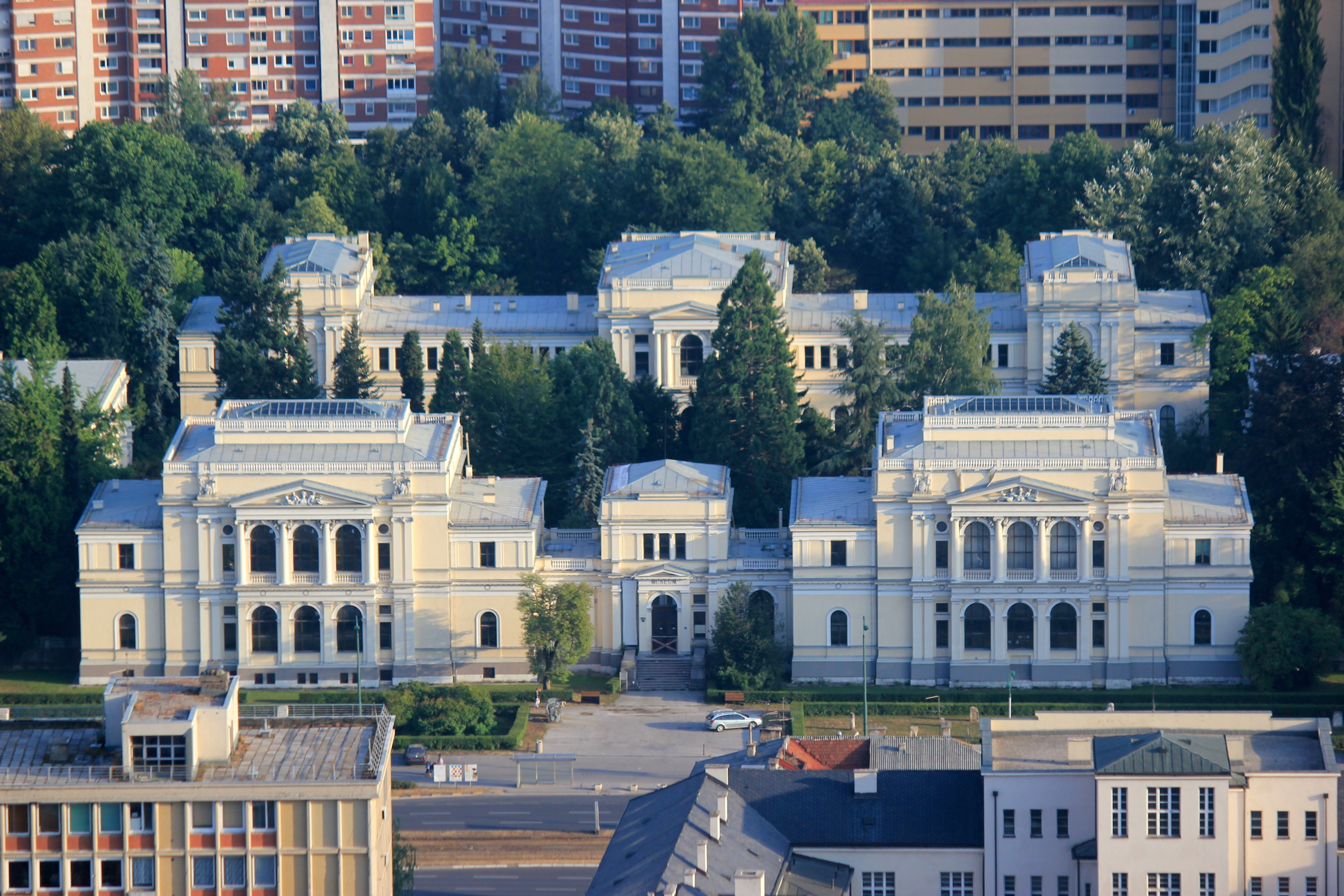
The National Museum of Bosnia and Herzegovina houses many important historical items from the country

Sarajevo is rich in museums, including the Museum of Sarajevo, the Ars Aevi Museum of Contemporary Art, Historical Museum of Bosnia and Herzegovina, The Museum of Literature and Theatre Arts of Bosnia and Herzegovina, and the National Museum of Bosnia and Herzegovina (established in 1888) home to the Sarajevo Haggadah, an illuminated manuscript and the oldest Sephardic Jewish document in the world issued in Barcelona around 1350, containing the traditional Jewish Haggadah, is on permanent display at the museum. It is the only remaining illustrated Sephardic Haggadah in the world. The National Museum also hosts year-round exhibitions about local, regional and international culture and history, and exhibits over 5,000 artifacts from Bosnia's history.

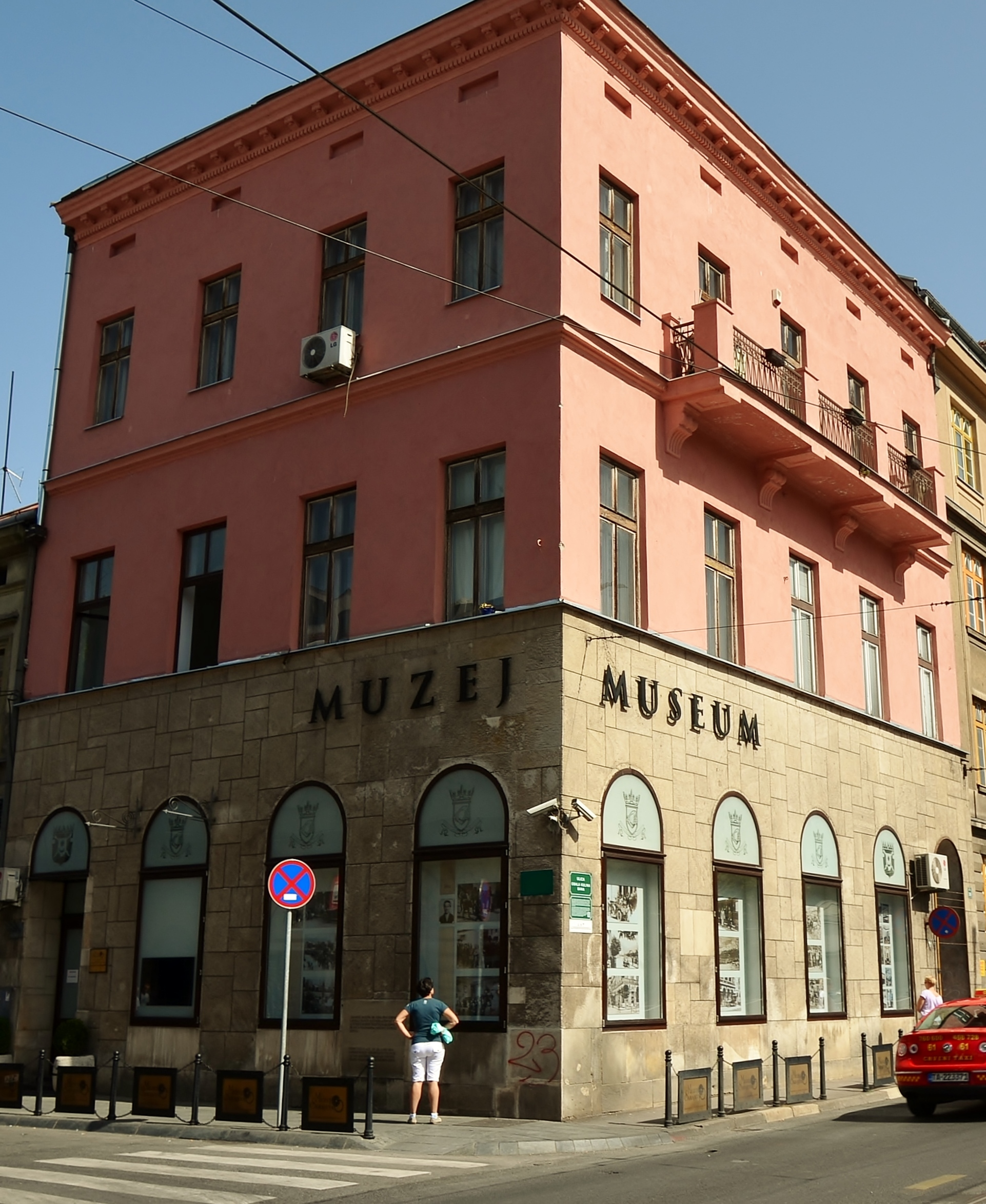
The Museum of Sarajevo 1878–1918

The Alija Izetbegović Museum was opened on 19 October 2007 and is in the old town fort, more specifically in the Vratnik Kapija towers Ploča and Širokac. The museum is a commemoration of the influence and body of work of Alija Izetbegović, the first president of the Presidency of the Republic of Bosnia and Herzegovina. Sarajevo is also home to the War Childhood Museum, an independent not-for-profit museum containing personal belongings from the war and showing stories behind them. In addition, in 2018, the museum won the Council of Europe Museum Prize award for best museum.

The city also hosts the Sarajevo National Theatre, established in 1921, and the Sarajevo Youth Theatre. Some other cultural institutions include the Center for Sarajevo Culture, Sarajevo City Library, National Gallery of Bosnia and Herzegovina, and the Bosniak Institute, a privately owned library and art collection focusing on Bosniak history.

Demolitions associated with the war, as well as reconstruction, destroyed several institutions and cultural or religious symbols including the Gazi Husrev-beg Library, the national library, the Sarajevo Oriental Institute, and a museum dedicated to the 1984 Winter Olympics. Consequently, the different levels of government established strong cultural protection laws and institutions. Bodies charged with cultural preservation in Sarajevo include the Institute for the Protection of the Cultural, Historical and Natural Heritage of Bosnia and Herzegovina (and their Sarajevo Canton counterpart), and the Bosnia and Herzegovina Commission to Preserve National Monuments.

=== Music ===
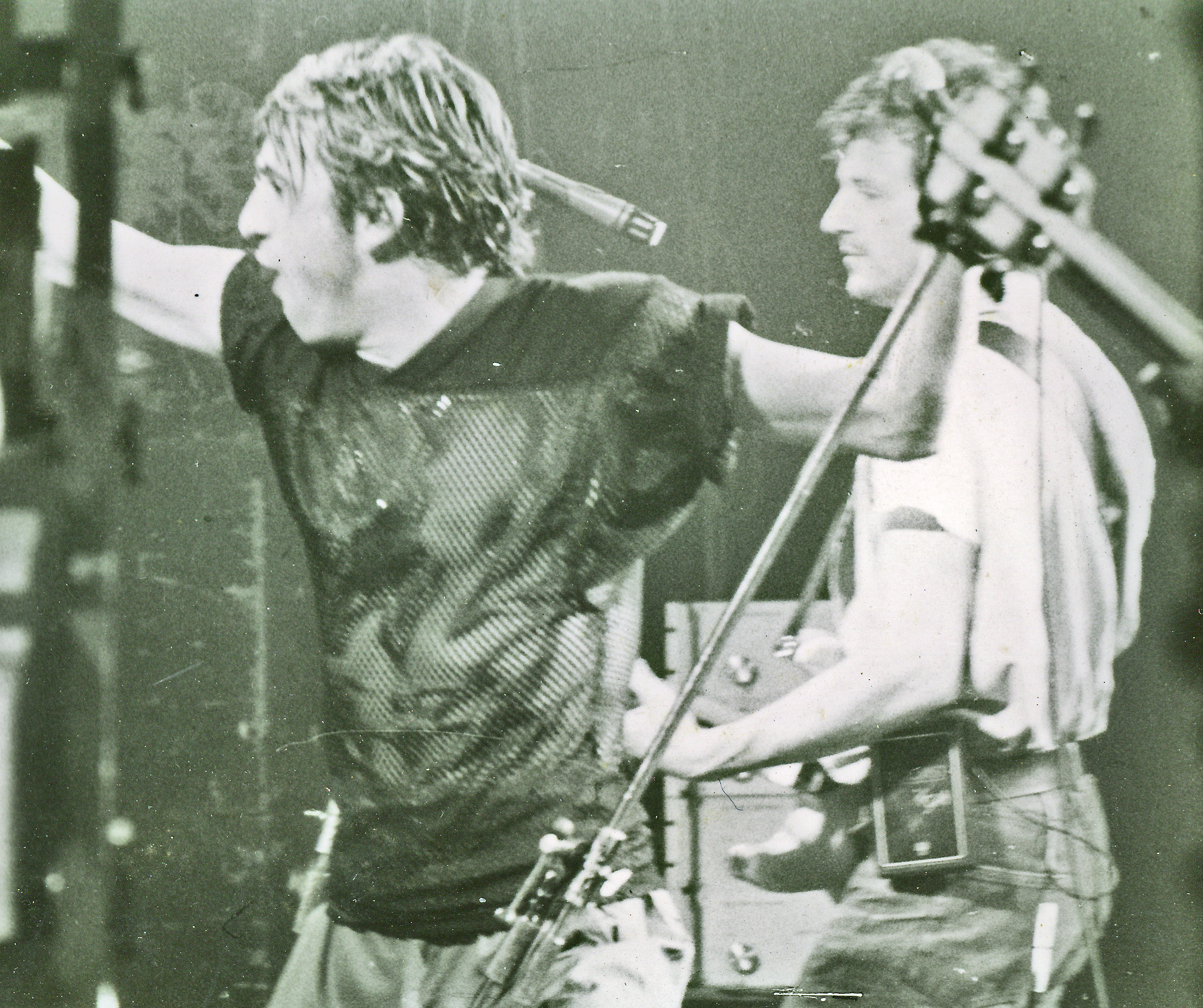
Bijelo Dugme, widely considered to have been the most popular band ever to exist in the former Yugoslavia and one of the most important acts of the Yugoslav rock scene, originated in Sarajevo. Pictured are Mladen Vojičić Tifa (left) and Goran Bregović

Sarajevo is and has historically been one of the most important musical enclaves in the region. The Sarajevo school of pop rock developed in the city between 1961 and 1991. This type of music began with bands like Indexi, Kodeksi, and singer-songwriter Kemal Monteno. It continued into the 1980s, with bands such as Plavi orkestar, Crvena jabuka, and Divlje jagode, by most accounts, pioneering the regional rock and roll movement. Sarajevo was also the home and birthplace of arguably the most popular and influential Yugoslav rock band of all time, Bijelo Dugme, somewhat of a Bosnian parallel to the Rolling Stones, in both popularity and influence.

Sarajevo was also the home of a very notable post-punk urban subculture known as the New Primitives, which began during the early 1980s with the Baglama Band which was banned shortly after its first LP and was brought into the mainstream through bands such as Zabranjeno Pušenje and Elvis J. Kurtović & His Meteors, as well as the Top lista nadrealista radio, and later television show. Other notable bands considered to be part of this subculture are Bombaj Štampa. Besides and separately from the New Primitives, Sarajevo is the hometown to one of the most significant ex-Yugoslavian alternative industrial-noise bands, SCH.

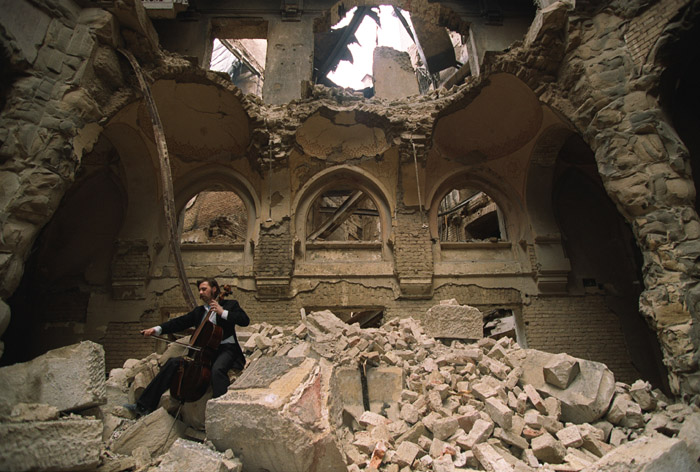
Vedran Smailović playing the cello on top of the ruins of the National library in 1992

Sarajevo in the late 19th and throughout the 20th century was home to a burgeoning and large center of Sevdalinka record-making and contributed greatly to this genre of music to the mainstream, which had for many centuries been a staple of Bosnian culture. Songwriters and musicians such as Himzo Polovina, Safet Isović, Zaim Imamović, Zehra Deović, Halid Bešlić, Hanka Paldum, Nada Mamula, Meho Puzić and many more composed and wrote some of their most important pieces in the city. Sarajevo also greatly influenced the pop scene of Yugoslavia with musicians like Zdravko Čolić, Kemal Monteno, Dino Merlin, Seid Memić Vajta, Hari Mata Hari, Mladen Vojičić Tifa, Željko Bebek and many more.

Many newer Sarajevo-based bands have also found a name and established themselves in Sarajevo, such as Regina who also had two albums out in Yugoslavia, and Letu Štuke, who formed in Yugoslavia in 1986, releasing their first album in 2006. Sarajevo is now home to a mix of new bands and independent musicians and a growing number of festivals, creative showcases, and concerts around the country. The city is also home to the region's largest jazz festival, the Jazz Fest Sarajevo.

American heavy metal band Savatage, released a song entitled "Christmas Eve (Sarajevo 12/24)" on their 1995 album Dead Winter Dead, which was about a cello player playing a forgotten Christmas carol in war-torn Sarajevo. The song was later re-released by the same band under the name Trans-Siberian Orchestra on their 1996 debut album Christmas Eve and Other Stories, which the song gave them instant success.

=== Festivals ===
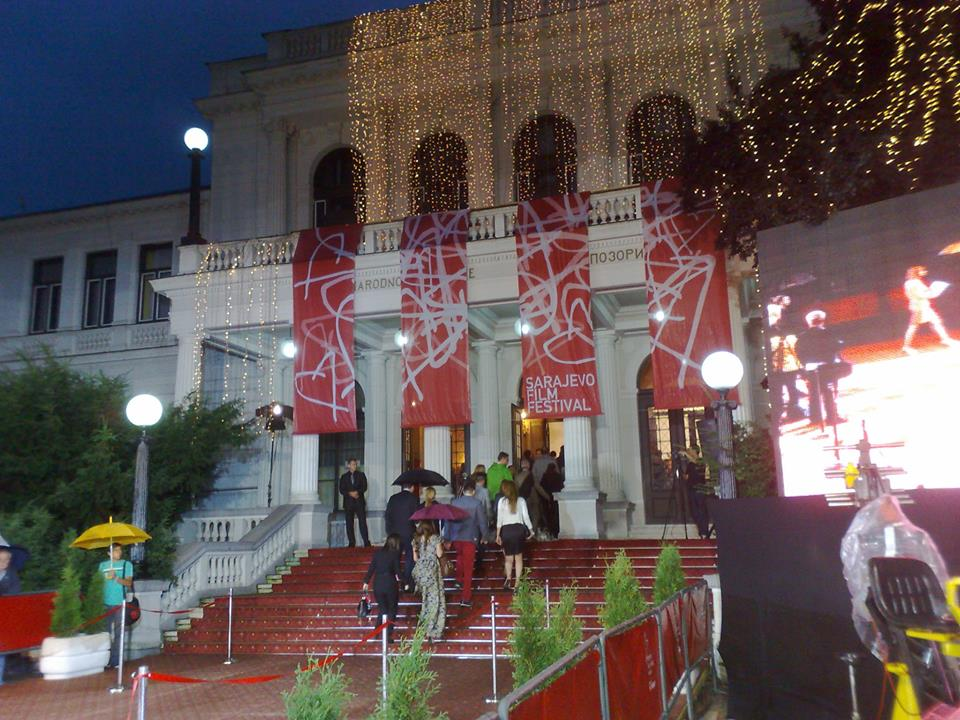
The Sarajevo Film Festival has been held annually since 1995 at the National Theatre

Sarajevo is internationally renowned for its eclectic and diverse selection of over 50 annual festivals. The Sarajevo Film Festival was established in 1995 during the Bosnian War and has become the premier and largest film festival in Southeast Europe. It has been hosted at the National Theater, with screenings at the Open-air theater Metalac and the Bosnian Cultural Center, all in downtown Sarajevo. The MESS International Festival is an experimental theatre festival and the oldest living theatre festival in the Balkans. The annual Sarajevo Youth Film Festival showcases feature, animated and short films from around the world and is the premier student film festival in the Balkans. The Sarajevo Winter Festival, Jazz Fest Sarajevo and Sarajevo International Music Festival are well-known, as is the Baščaršija Nights festival, a month-long showcase of local culture, music, and dance.

The first incarnation of the Sarajevo Film Festival was hosted in still-warring Sarajevo in 1995, and has now progressed into being the biggest and most significant festival in Southeast Europe. A talent campus is also held during the duration of the festival, with lecturers speaking on behalf of world cinematography and holding workshops for film students from across Southeast Europe.

The Jazz Fest Sarajevo is the region's largest and most diverse of its kind. The festival takes place at the Bosnian Cultural Center (aka "Main Stage"), just down the street from the SFF, at the Sarajevo Youth Stage Theater (aka "Strange Fruits Stage"), at the Dom Vojske Federacije (aka "Solo Stage"), and at the CDA (aka "Groove Stage").

=== Sports ===
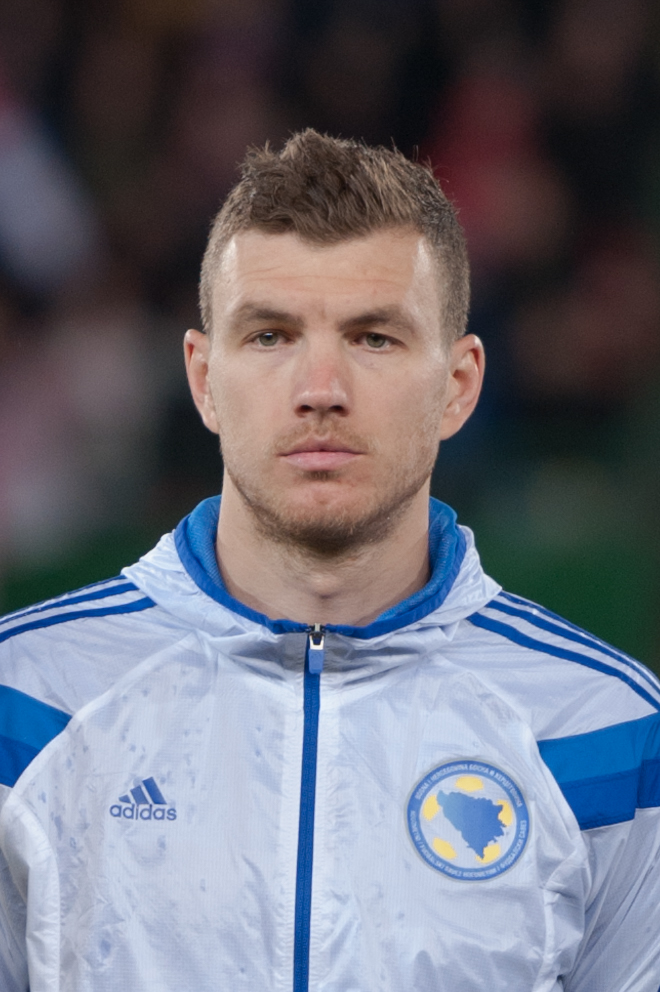
Bosnian football player Edin Džeko was born in Sarajevo. He is the all-time leading goalscorer and most capped player of the Bosnia and Herzegovina national football team

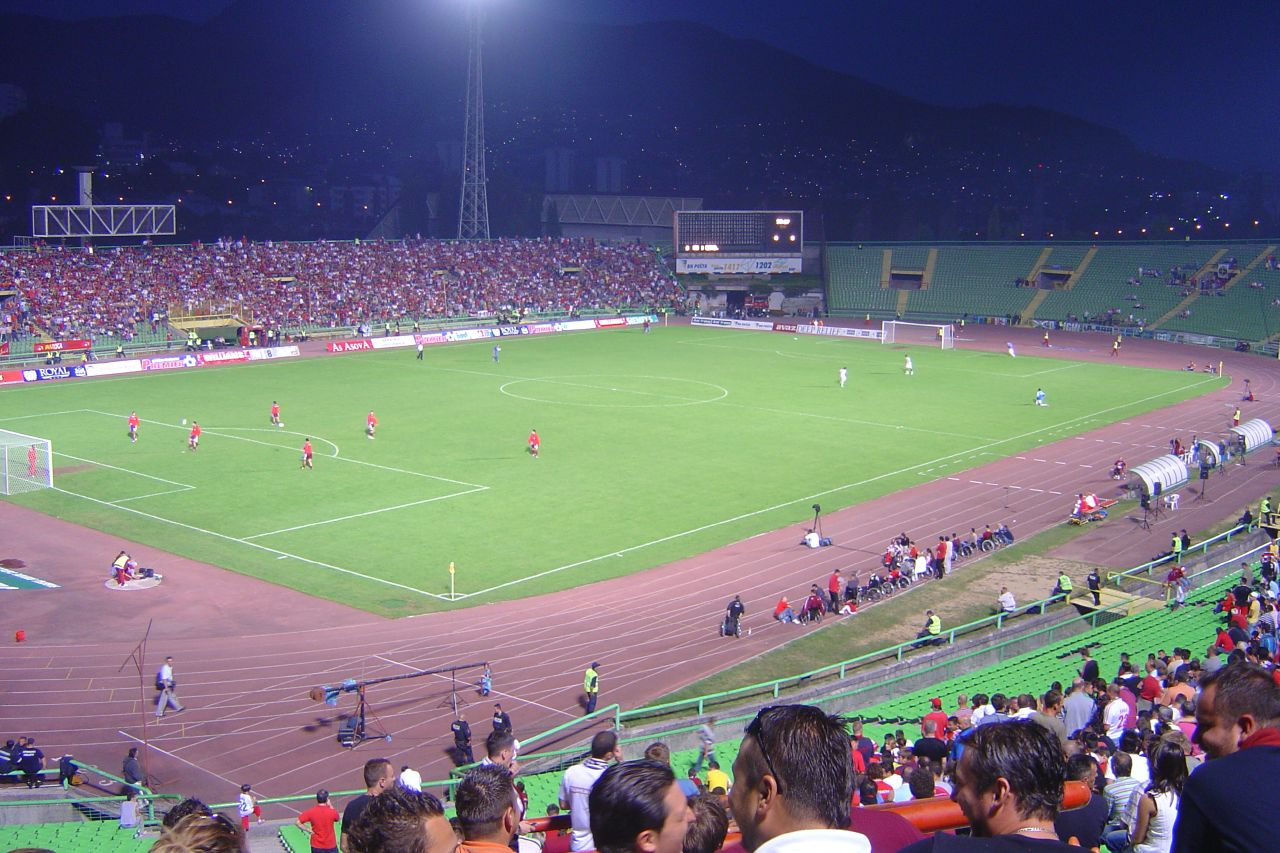
Koševo City Stadium, home to FK Sarajevo, is the largest stadium in Bosnia and Herzegovina

Sarajevo hosted the 1984 Winter Olympics. Yugoslavia won one medal, a silver in men's giant slalom awarded to Jure Franko. Many of the Olympic facilities survived the war or were reconstructed, including the Zetra Olympic Hall and Asim Ferhatović Stadium. In an attempt to bring back some of Sarajevo's Olympic glory, the original Olympic luge and bobsled tracks are being repaired, due to the efforts of both the Olympic Committee of Bosnia and Herzegovina and local sports enthusiasts.

After co-hosting the Southeast Europe Friendship games, Sarajevo was awarded the 2009 Special Olympic winter games, but canceled these plans. The ice arena for the 1984 Olympics, Zetra Stadium, was used during the war as a temporary hospital and, later, for housing NATO troops of the IFOR.

In 2011, Sarajevo was the host city of the 51st World Military Skiing Championship with over 350 participants from 23 different nations. This was the first international event of such standing since the 1984 Olympics. Football is popular in Sarajevo; the city hosts FK Sarajevo and FK Željezničar, which both compete in European and international cups and tournaments and have a very large trophy cabinet in the former Yugoslavia as well as independent Bosnia and Herzegovina. Other notable football clubs include Olimpik, SAŠK and Slavija. Grbavica Stadium, the home stadium of Željezničar, is one of the most notable sports venues in the country.

Mirza Delibašić Hall, home venue of past European champion KK Bosna

Another popular sport is basketball; the basketball club KK Bosna won the European Championship in 1979 as well as many Yugoslav and Bosnian national championships, making it one of the greatest basketball clubs in the former Yugoslavia. The chess club, Bosna Sarajevo, has been a championship team since the 1980s and is the third-ranked chess club in Europe, having won four consecutive European championships in the nineties. Handball club RK Bosna also competes in the European Champions League and is considered one of the most well-organized handball clubs in Southeast Europe with a very large fan base and excellent national, as well as international results. Sarajevo often holds international events and competitions in sports such as tennis and kickboxing.

The popularity of tennis has been picking up in recent years. Since 2003, BH Telecom Indoors has been an annual tennis tournament in Sarajevo.

Since 2007, the Sarajevo Half Marathon has been organized every year in late September. Giro di Sarajevo is also a run in the city with over 2,200 cyclists taking part in 2015.

In mountaineering, the local chapter of the HPS is HPD "Bjelašnica", which had 216 members in 1936 under the Josip Fleger presidency. At the time, it had a ski section. Membership rose to 234 in 1937, and Ante Martinović was elected its president. Membership fell to 230 in 1938, with Josip Fleger again president.

In February 2019, Sarajevo and East Sarajevo hosted the European Youth Olympic Winter Festival (EYOWF).

== International relations ==
=== Twin towns – sister cities ===
Sarajevo is twinned with:

- Coventry, United Kingdom (since 1957)
- Tlemcen, Algeria (since 1964)
- Baku, Azerbaijan (since 1972)
- Magdeburg, Germany (since 1972)
- Friedrichshafen, Germany (since 1972)
- Tripoli, Libya (since 1976)
- Ferrara, Italy (since 1978)
- Bursa, Turkey (since 1979)
- Innsbruck, Austria (since 1980)
- Tianjin, China (since 1981)
- Harrisburg, United States (since 1984)
- Venice, Italy (since 1994)
- Collegno, Italy (since 1994)
- Ankara, Turkey (since 1994)
- Budapest, Hungary (since 1995)
- Serre Chevalier, France (since 1995)
- Prato, Italy (since 1995)
- Tirana, Albania (since 1996)
- Istanbul, Turkey (since 1997)
- Kuwait City, Kuwait (since 1998)
- Dayton, United States (since 1999)
- Barcelona, Spain (since 2000)
- Madrid, Spain (since 2007)
- Pula, Croatia (since 2012)
- Tehran, Iran (since 2016)
- Skopje, North Macedonia (since 2017)
- Doha, Qatar (since 2018)
- İzmir, Turkey (since 2022)
- Podgorica, Montenegro (since 2022)

=== Friendship ===
Sarajevo is befriended with:

- Naples, Italy (since 1976)
- Wolfsburg, Germany (since 1985)
- Calgary, Canada (since 1986)
- Stockholm, Sweden (since 1997)
- Zagreb, Croatia (since 2001)
- Ljubljana, Slovenia (since 2002)
- Salt Lake City, United States (since 2002)
- Cairo, Egypt (since 2006)
- Dubrovnik, Croatia (since 2006)
- Konya, Turkey (since 2007)
- Vukovar, Croatia (since 2011)
- Bad Ischl, Austria (since 2016)
- Hiroshima, Japan (since 2017)
- Central AO (Moscow), Russia (since 2017)
- Belgrade, Serbia (since 2017)
- Rueil-Malmaison, France

== See also ==
- Architecture of Bosnia and Herzegovina
- Moorish Revival architecture in Bosnia and Herzegovina
- List of National Monuments of Bosnia and Herzegovina
- List of World Heritage Sites in Bosnia and Herzegovina
- List of Museums in Bosnia and Herzegovina
- Centre for Nonviolent Action
- Folklore of Sarajevo
- Istočno Sarajevo
- List of people from Sarajevo
- List of shopping malls in Sarajevo
- Music of Bosnia and Herzegovina
- Roman Catholic Archdiocese of Vrhbosna
- List of tourist attractions in Sarajevo
- Tourism in Bosnia and Herzegovina
