= Trams in Sarajevo =

Public transport system in Sarajevo, Bosnia and Herzegovina

Sarajevo tramway network
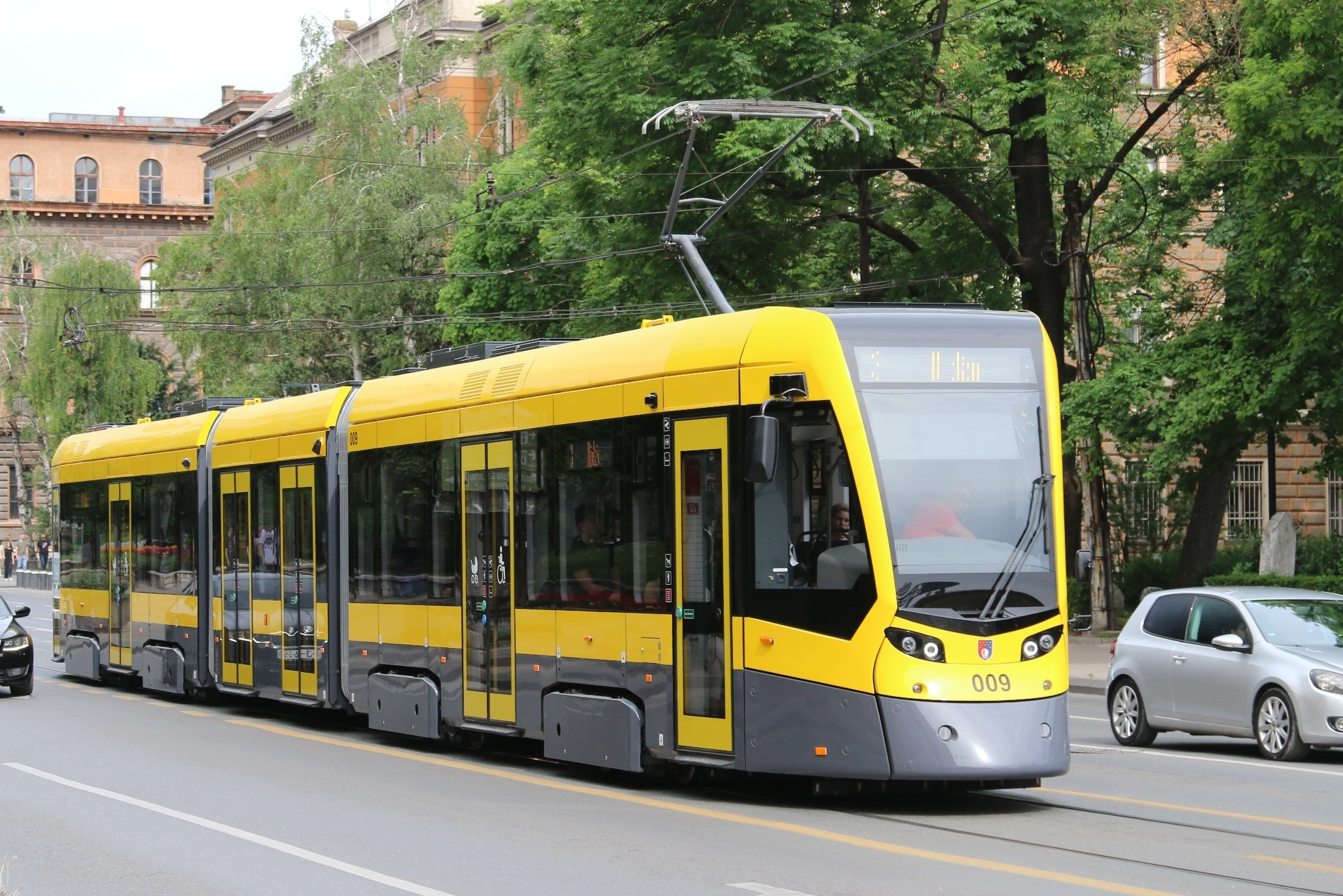
- Sarajevo tram

Overview
- Locale: Sarajevo, Bosnia and Herzegovina
- Transit type: Tram
- Number of lines: 7
- Number of stations: 37
- Website: gras.ba

Operation
- Began operation: 1885 (horse tram); 1895 (electric tram)
- Operator: KJKP GRAS Sarajevo
- Number of vehicles: 95

Technical
- System length: 17.3 km (10.7 mi)
- Track gauge: 1,435 mm (4 ft 8 1/2 in) standard gauge
- Old gauge: 760 mm (2 ft 5 15/16 in) Bosnian gauge until 1960
System map

Trams in Sarajevo are a part of the public transport system in Sarajevo, the capital city of Bosnia and Herzegovina. The system is run by KJKP GRAS Sarajevo, which also operates trolleybus and bus routes in the city.

As of 2026, the Sarajevo tram system consists of seven lines, running along a single route with a 0.4 kilometres (0.25 mi)-long branch to the city's main railway station (Željeznička stanica). It primarily serves as an east-west link from the city centre (Baščaršija) to the western suburb of Ilidža.

== History ==
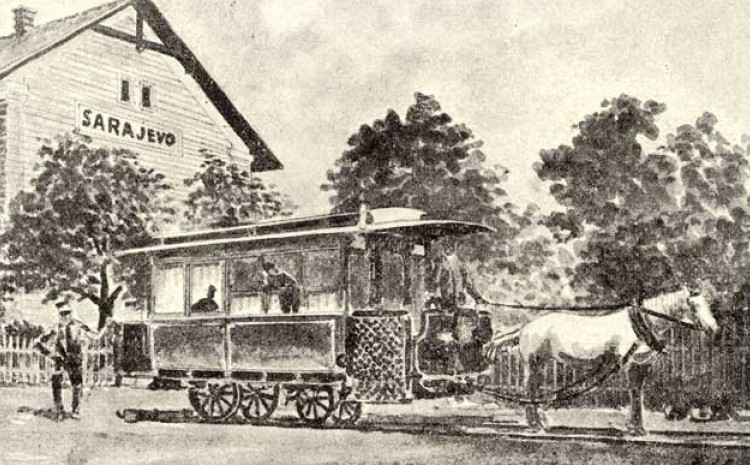
Sarajevo horse-drawn tram in 1885

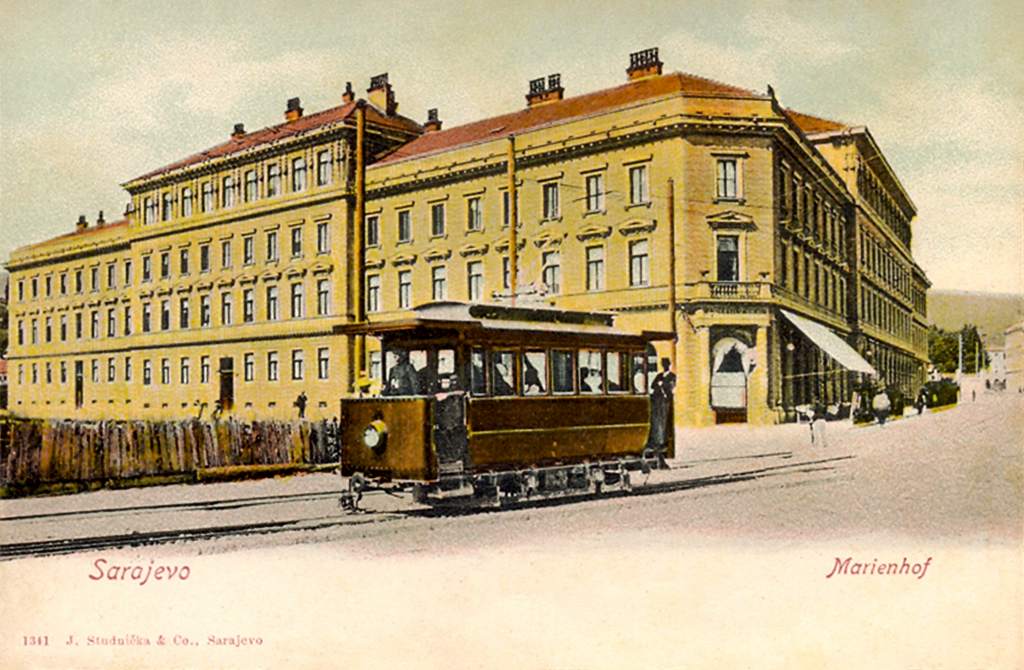
Sarajevo electric tram in 1901

Opened on New Year's Day in 1885, the Sarajevo tramway was the testing line for the tram in Vienna and the Austro-Hungarian Empire, and operated by horses. Originally built to 760 mm (2 ft 5 15/16 in) Bosnian gauge, the present system was upgraded to 1,435 mm (4 ft 8 1/2 in) standard gauge in 1960. The trams played a pivotal role in the growth of the city in the 20th century.

During the Siege of Sarajevo of 1992-1995, trackwork and numerous vehicles were badly damaged. The tram operation stopped on 15 April 1992, 9 days after the siege started, and resumed despite the dangers of the ongoing siege on 15 April 1994. The vehicles are once again operational though marks remain on some vehicles.

== System ==
The route lies on the main boulevard of Sarajevo, which is named (from west to east) first Bulevar Meše Selimovića (formerly 6 Proleterske Brigade), from Čengić Vila then Zmaj od Bosne (formerly Vojvode Radomira Putnika). From the district Marijin Dvor it runs a loop in a counter-clockwise direction along the Miljacka river on the street called Obala Kulina bana (formerly: Obala Vojvode Stepe Stepanovića). It proceeds to the terminus Baščaršija. The route then turns back towards Marijin Dvor on the northern parallel Marshal Tito street.

Seven routes are presently in operation on the system, often only a specific section of the track. Only Route 11 operates the entire length.

- Route 1: Željeznička stanica – Baščaršija
- Route 2: Čengić Vila – Baščaršija
- Route 3: Ilidža – Baščaršija
- Route 4: Ilidža – Željeznička stanica
- Route 5: Nedžarići – Baščaršija
- Route 6: Ilidža – Skenderija
- Route 7: Nedžarići – Skenderija
- Route 11: Baščaršija – Hrasnica

In the early 1990s, construction work started to expand the tram network from Nedžarići to Dobrinja, which was at the time served by a trolleybus system. Work stopped in 1992 when the siege started, which was also when most of the vehicles and infrastructure was damaged. At Nedžarići, it is possible to see tracks leading towards a planned, but never finished boulevard that would link towards Dobrinja. No work has been done in the said neighborhood to prepare access of trams there due to the start of the war, so these are the only traces of the planned extension.

In 2014, plans were considered to extend the tram line from Ilidža to Hrasnica. In October 2023, construction began to extend the tram line at a total length of 13 kilometers (both ways). On 16 August 2026, the electric line became operational. The roundabout in Ilidža was modernized and enlarged, the first time it was worked on since its inception in 1961. The first test ride on the Ilidža-Hrasnica line was conducted on 20 August 2026. The extension officially opened on 27 September 2026.

== Fleet ==
=== History ===
In 1958, Sarajevo bought 50 relatively modern PCC streetcars from Washington, renumbered in the 1-50 series. Another 21 more Washington PCCs followed in 1962, numbered 51-71. These 71 PCCs were built between 1941 and 1944 by the St. Louis Car Company. Between 1967 and 1969, 20 of these streetcars were reconstructed into ten articulated cars and renumbered 100-109.

The fleet in use on the network are Tatra K2 articulated trams from the Czech Republic, delivered in the 1970s and early 1980s. Later these trams were joined by more modern vehicles in recent times. In 2008, Amsterdam donated 16 old trams to Sarajevo.

In September 2021, Stadler was awarded a contract to supply 15 Tango NF3 trams to the city. The first vehicle was unveiled at the 15th Trako International Railway Fair on 20 September 2023. The first tram arrived in December 2023, while the rest arrived by the summer of 2024. An additional 10 new trams were also bought.

=== Current fleet ===
As of August 2025

Image	Type	Subtypes	Since	Current	Original	Note
Tatra K2	Tatra K2	Tatra K2YU	1973	7	91	18 of these were modernized to Satra II and Satra III
Stadler Tango NF3	Stadler Tango	Stadler Tango NF3	2024	20	25	2 trams on delivery (23 are delivered, but 3 of them aren't in service)
	Duewag GT8	Duewag GT8	2015	15	20	ex. Konya trams
Lohner	Lohner	Lohner type E	2004	1	15	ex. Vienna trams
Satra II	Satra II	Satra II	1998	1	15	Modernized Tatra K2's (from Brno) and Tatra K2YU's
Satra III	Satra III	Satra III	2003	2	6	Modernized Tatra K2's (from Brno) and Tatra K2YU's
Tatra KT8D5	Tatra KT8D5	Tatra KT8D5	1990	1	5	ex. Košice trams

== Gallery ==
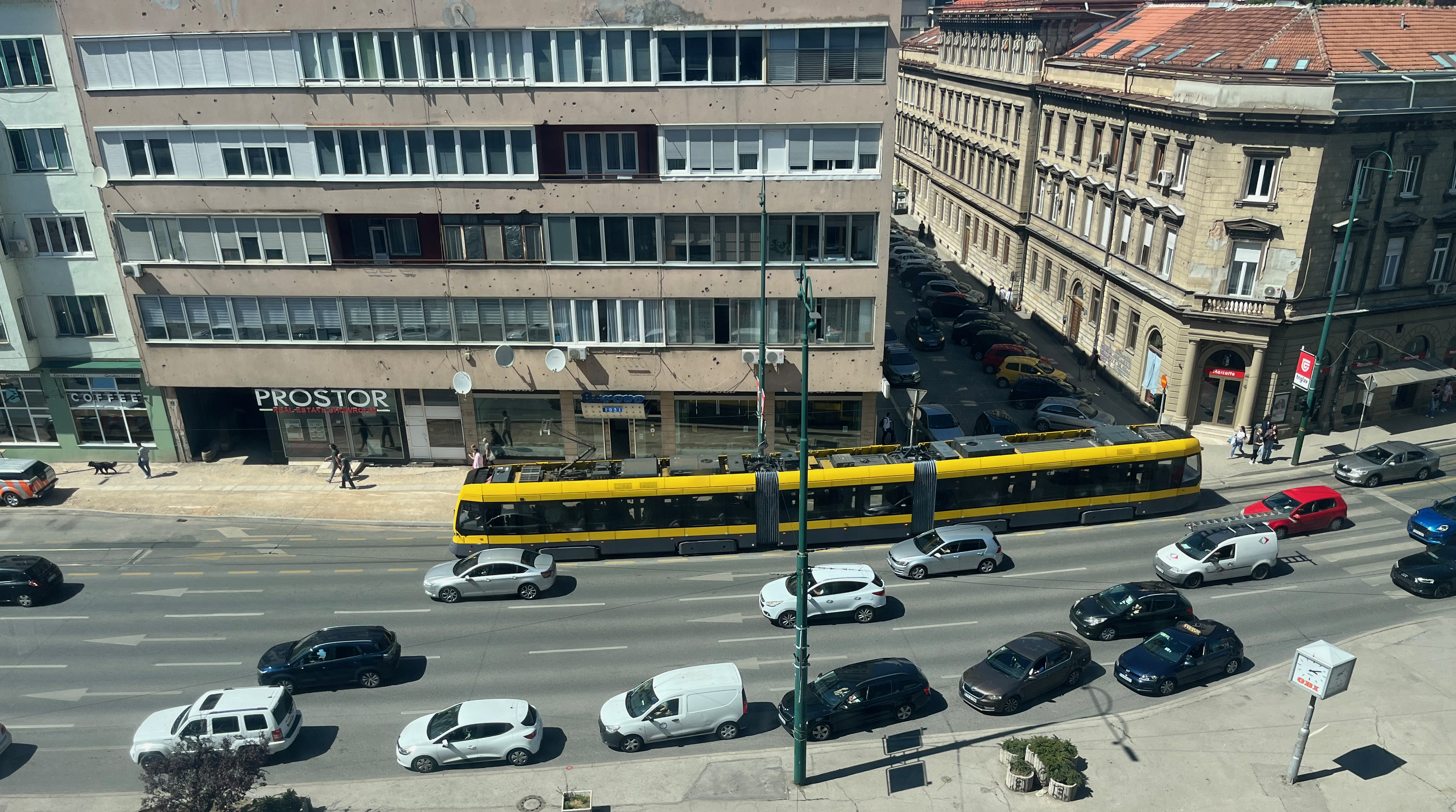
Tram #009, 6 June 2024

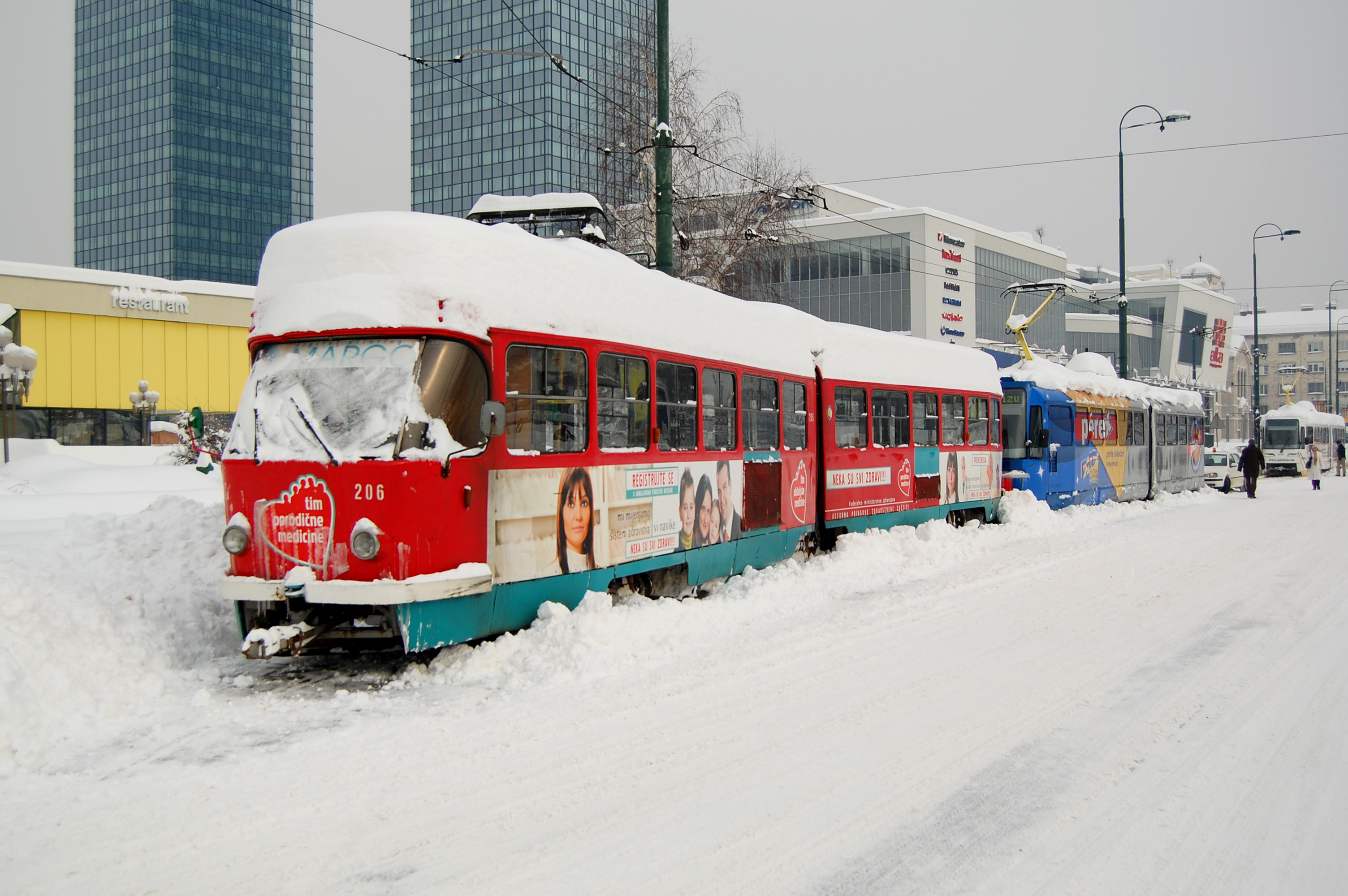
Trams stopped running due to heavy snowfall, at Marijin Dvor on 5 February 2012

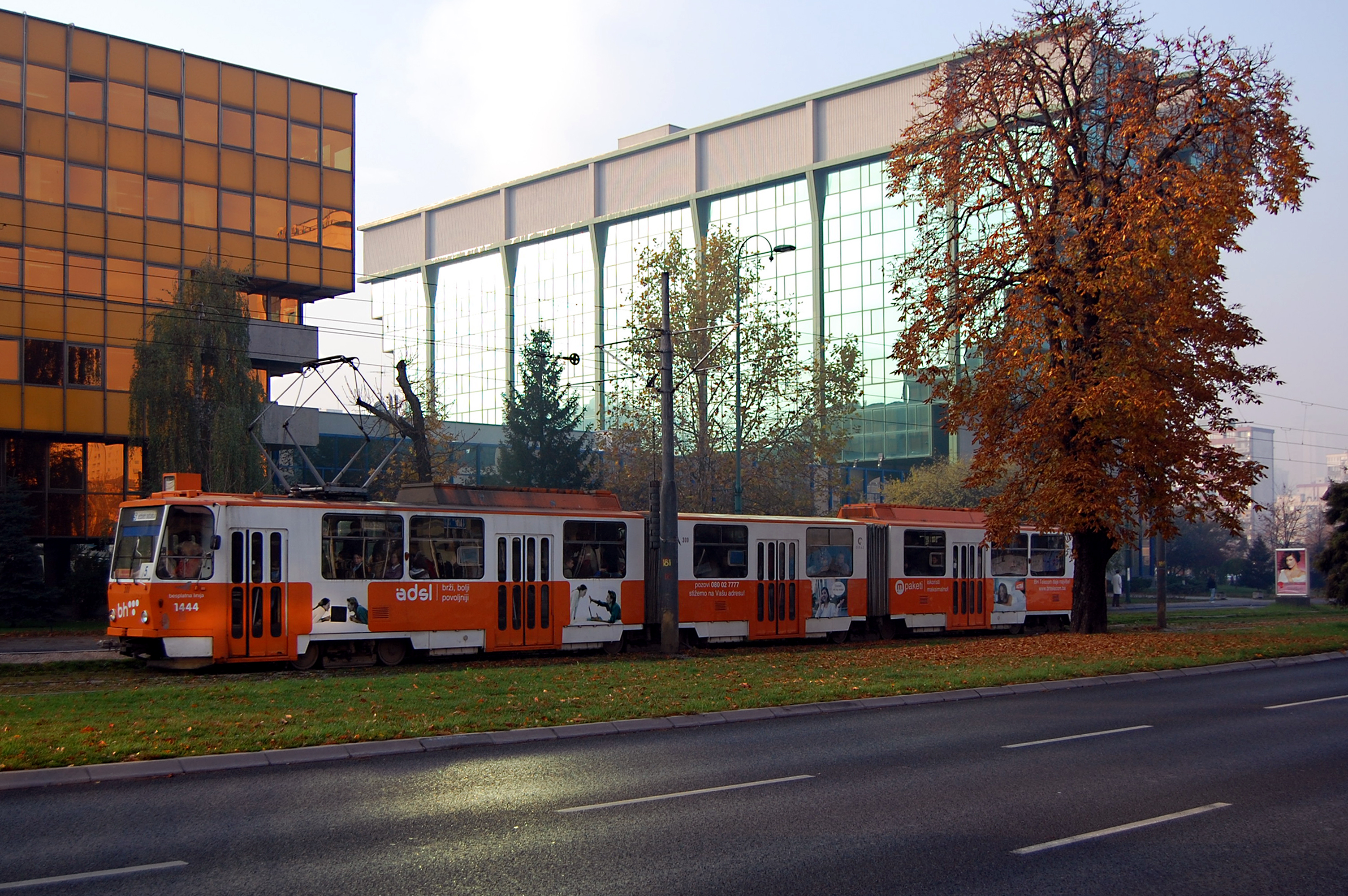
Tram #300 past Socijalno

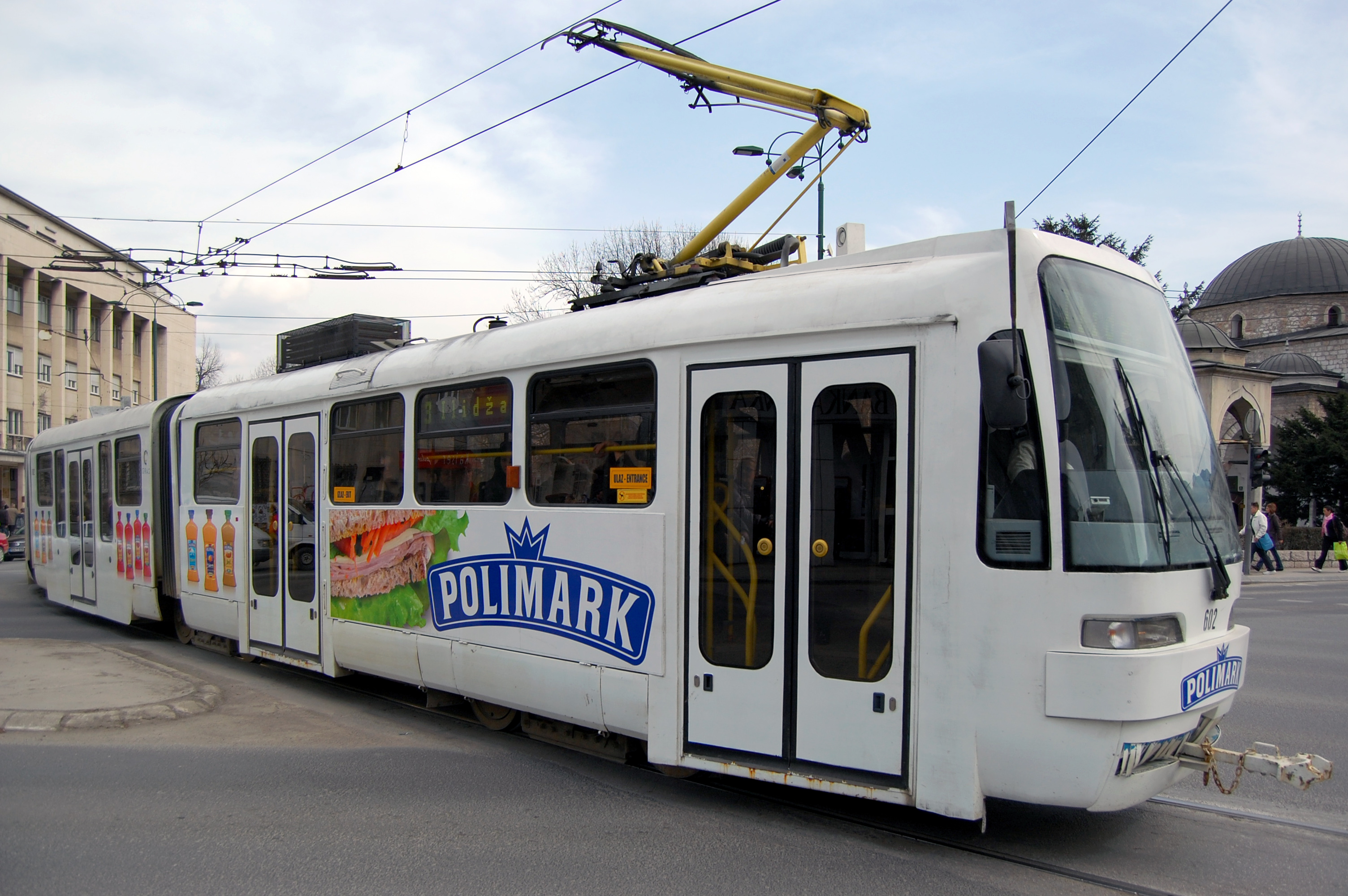
Tram #602 past Park

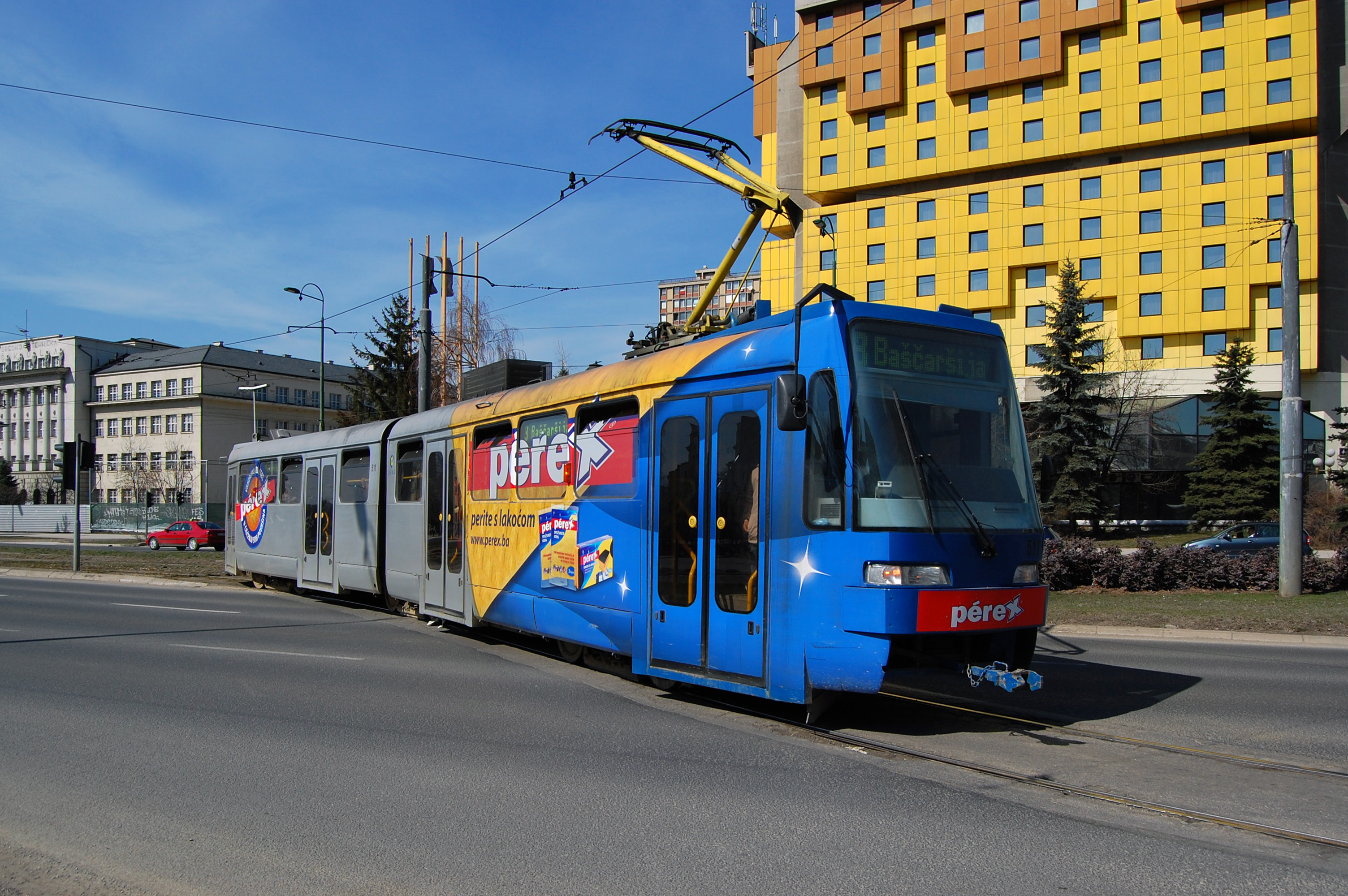
Tram #511 at Holiday Inn

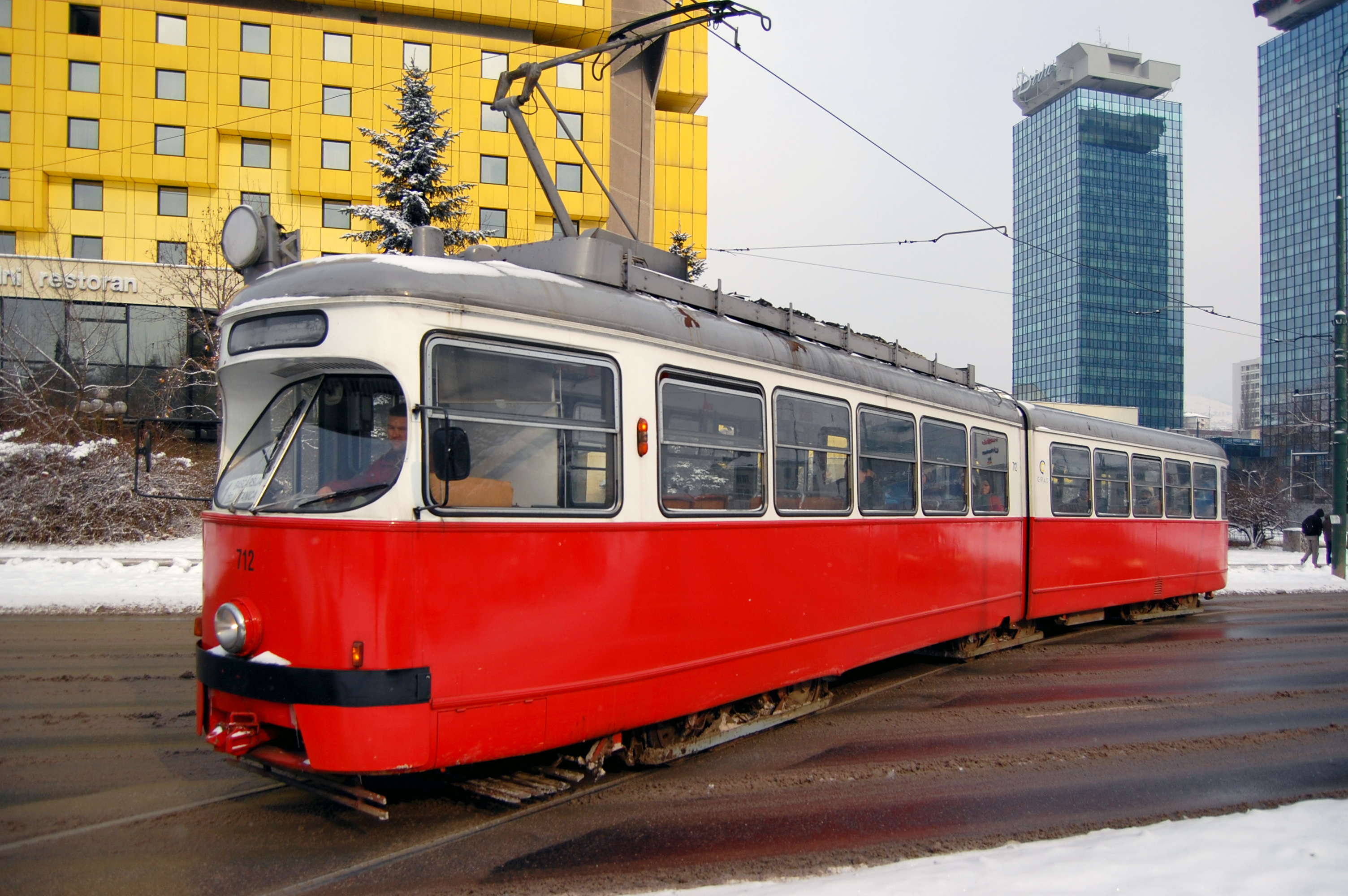
Tram #712 at Holiday Inn

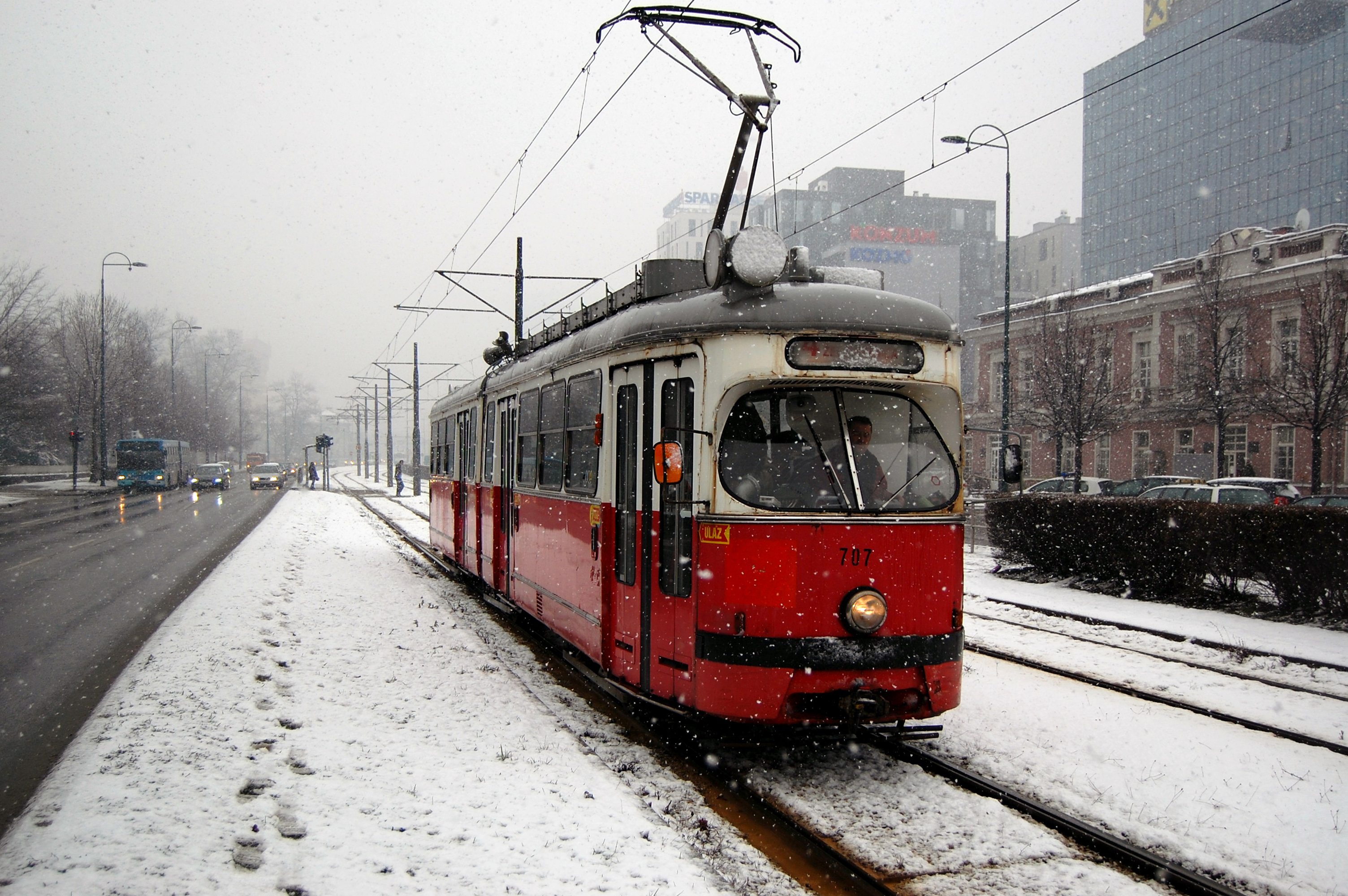
Tram #707 past Univerzitet

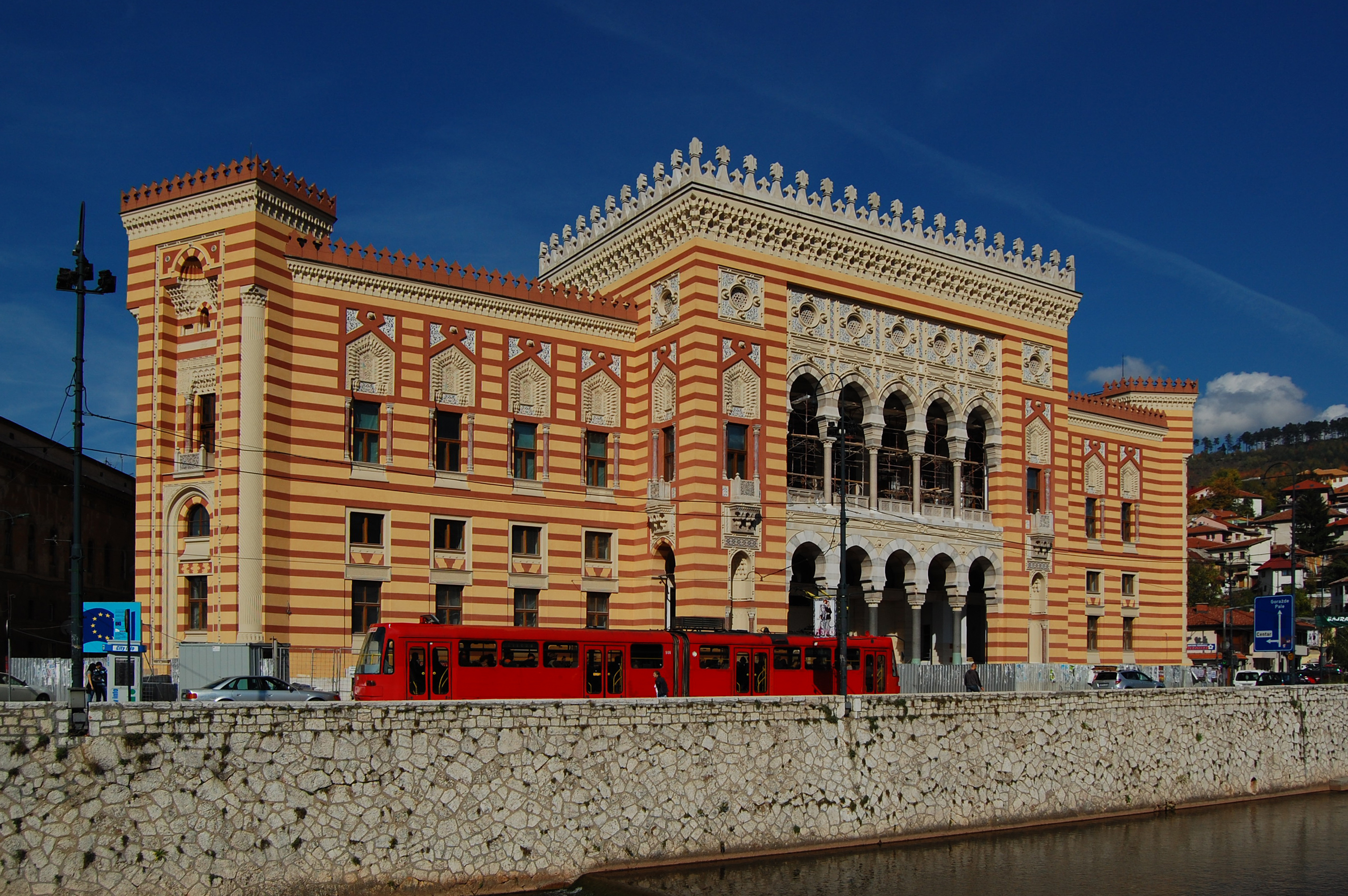
Tram #506 at Vijećnica

Trams #805 and #812 at Socijalno

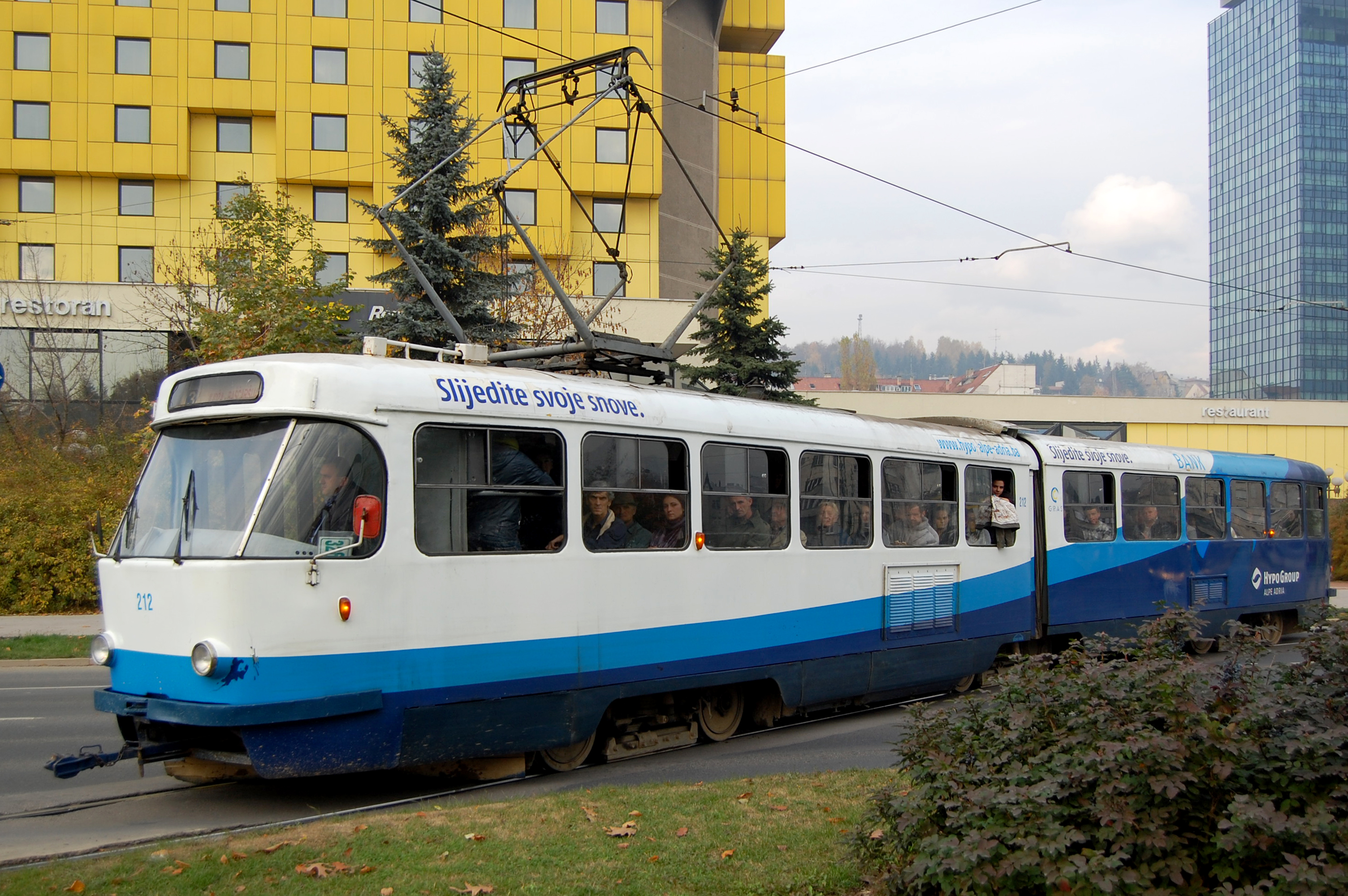
Tram #212 at Holiday Inn

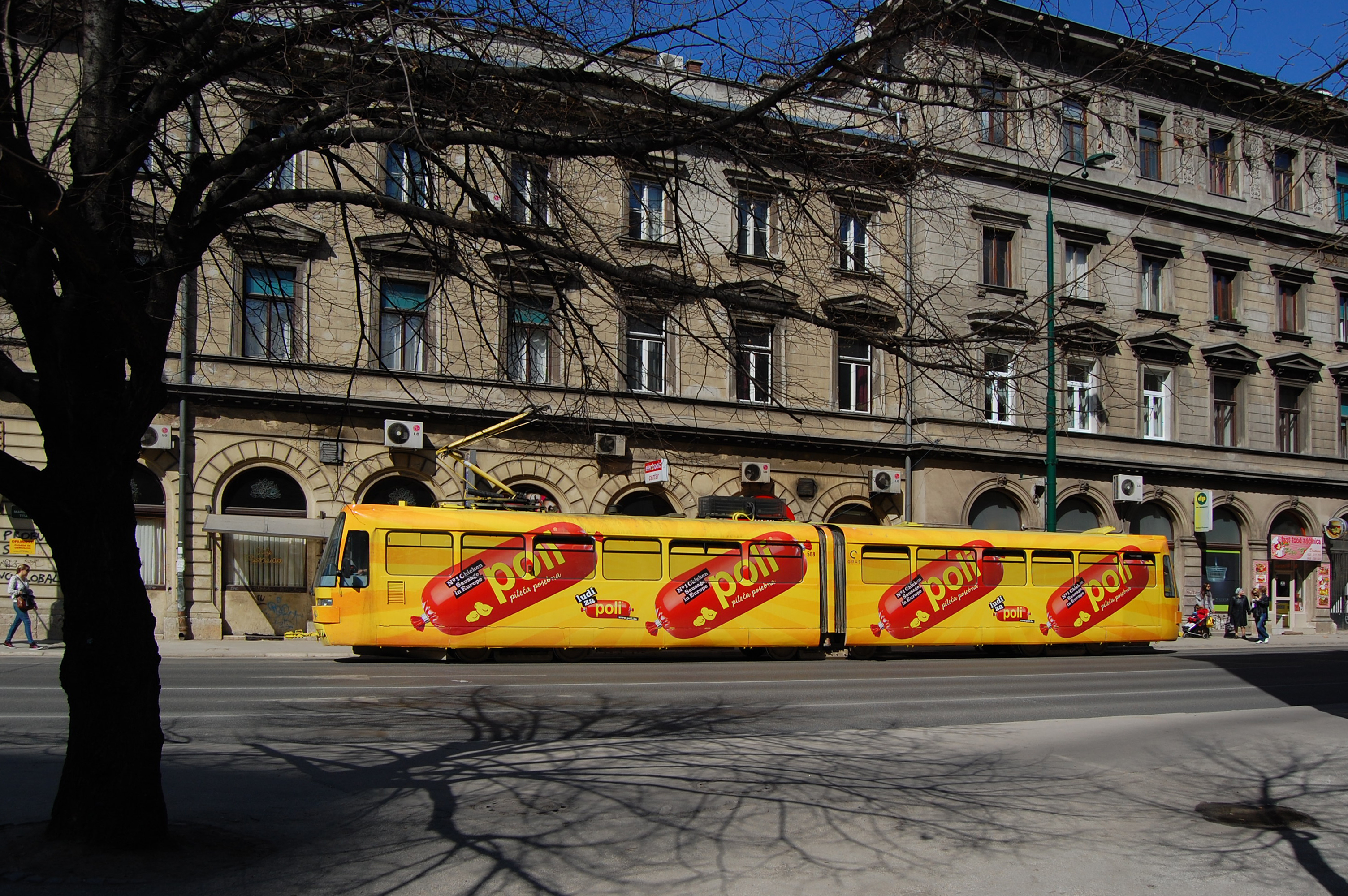
Tram #508 running westbound at Marijin Dvor,

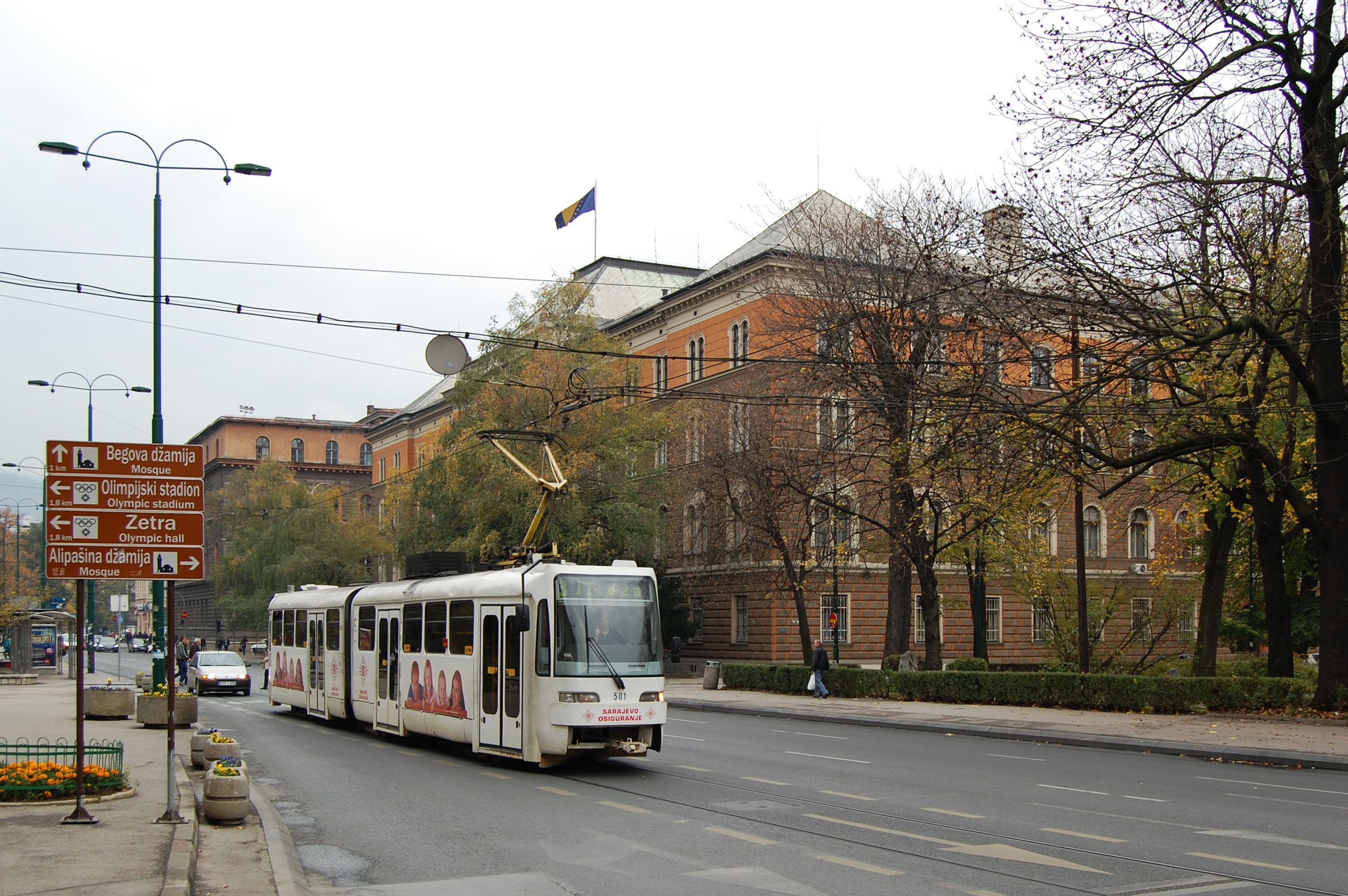
Tram #501 past Park

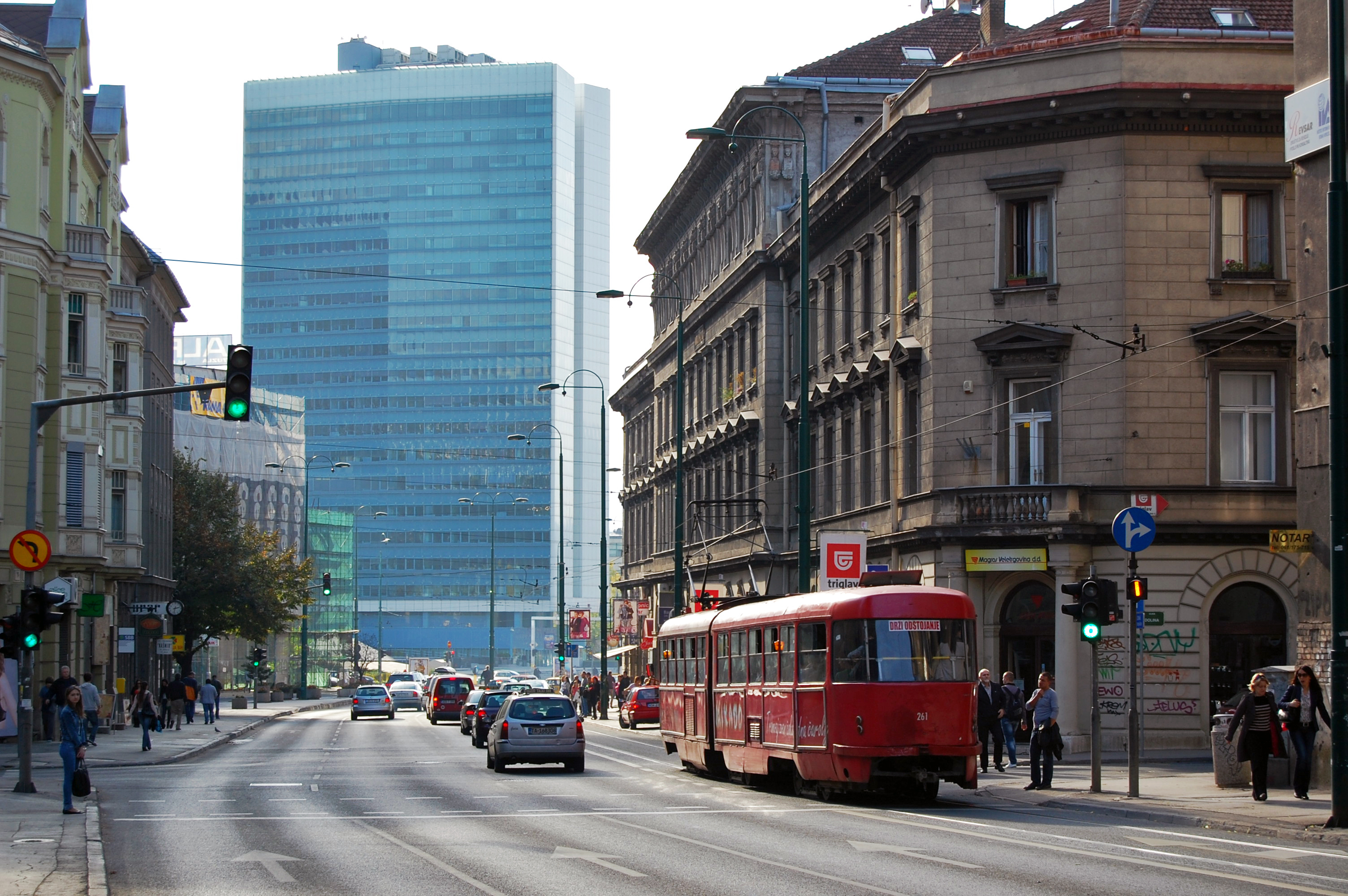
Tram #261 at Marijin Dvor,

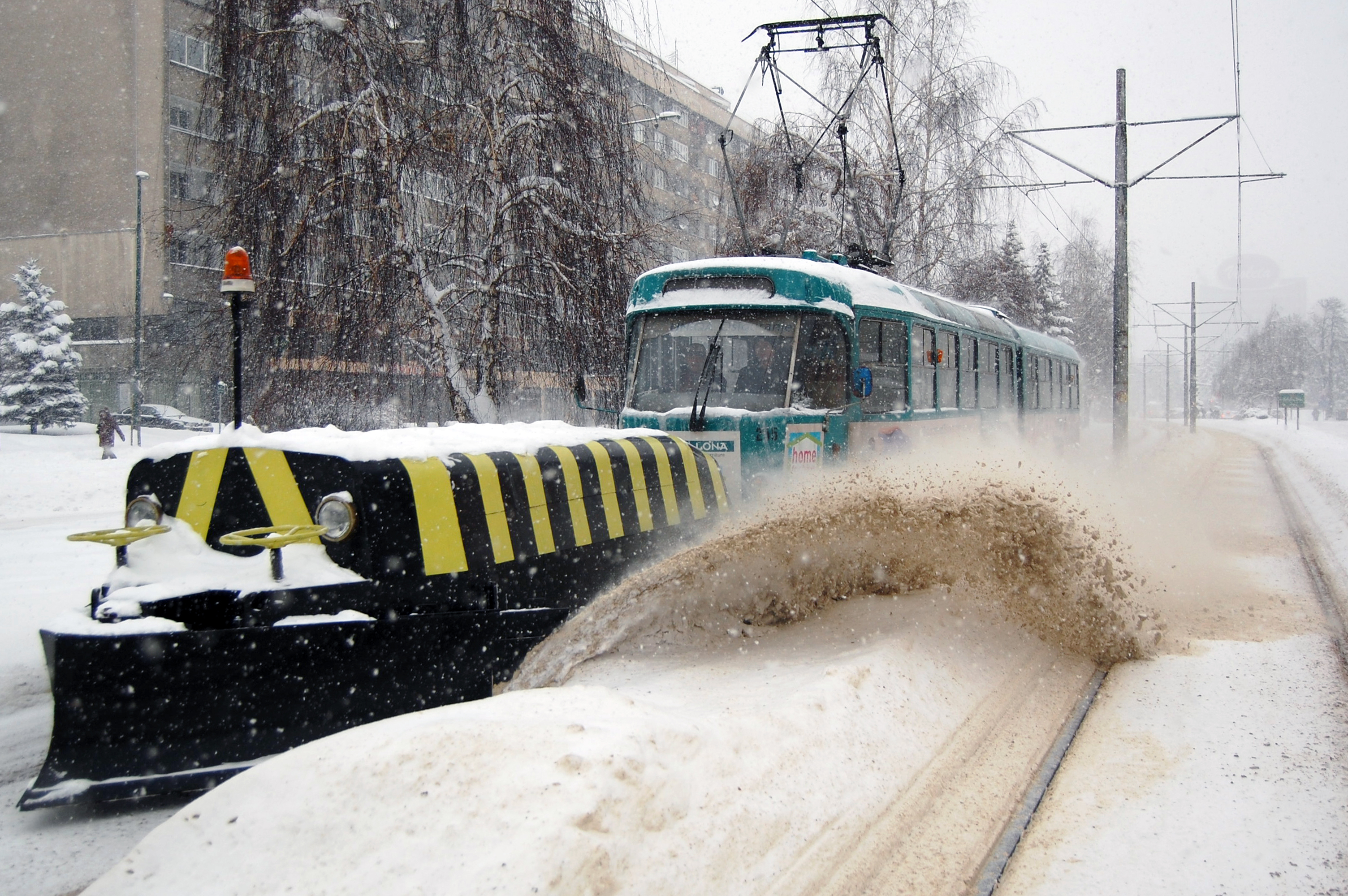
Heavy snowfall on 3 February 2012

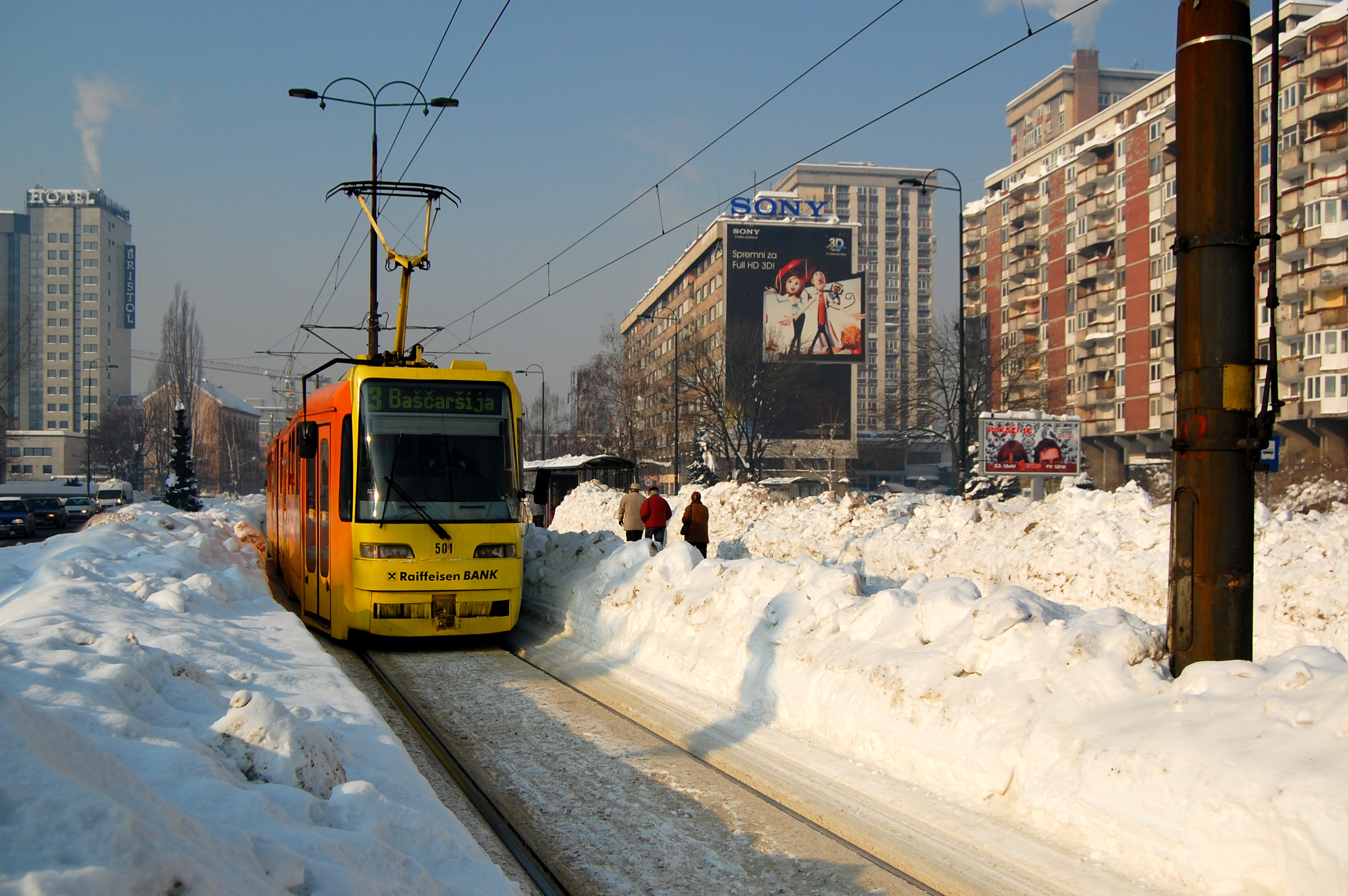

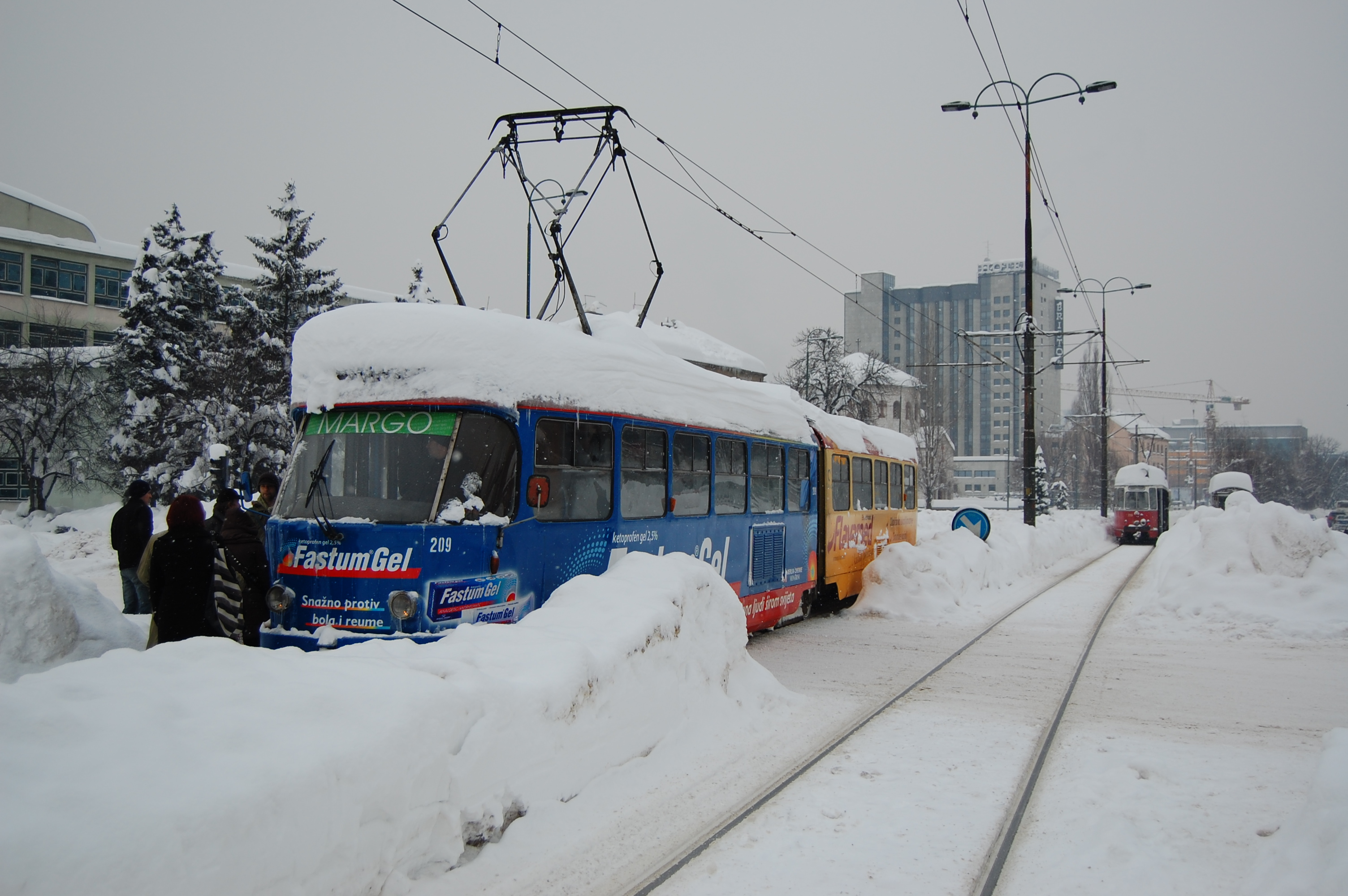

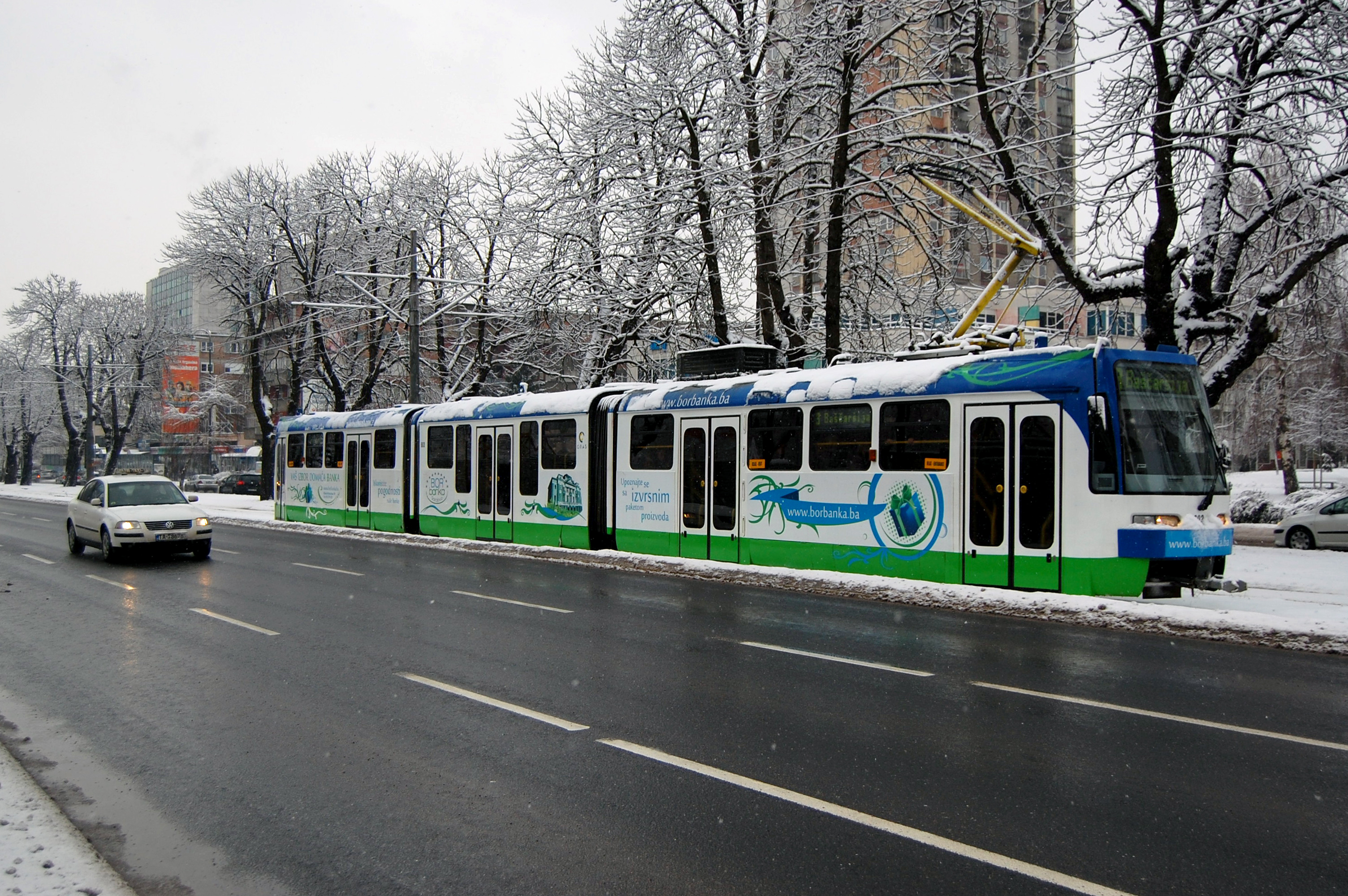
Satra III

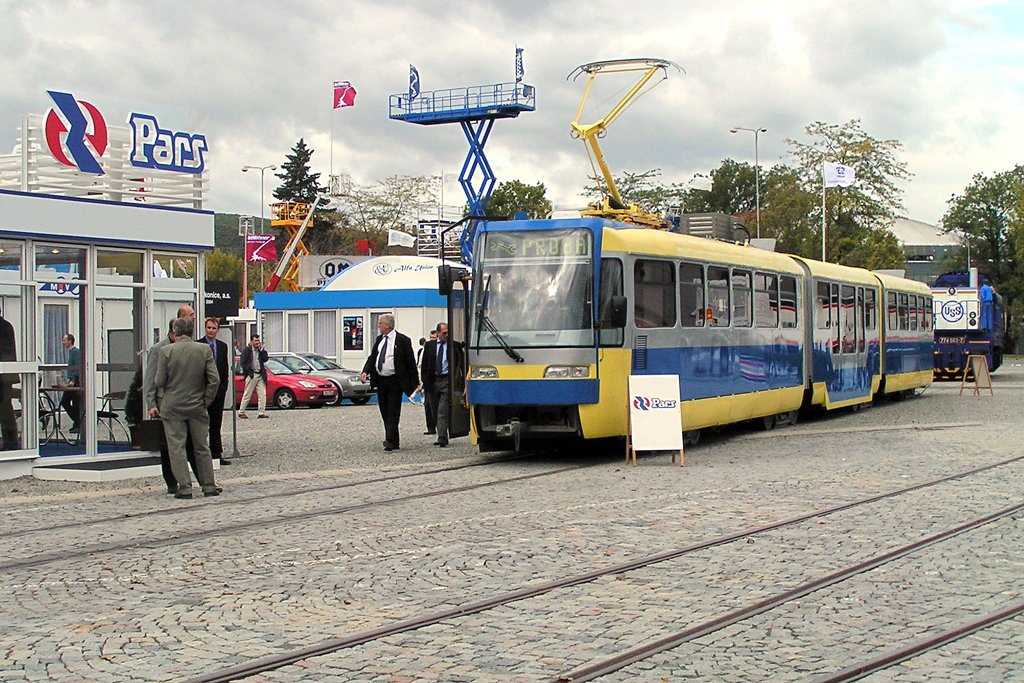
Refurbished Tatra 3-carriage tram on display

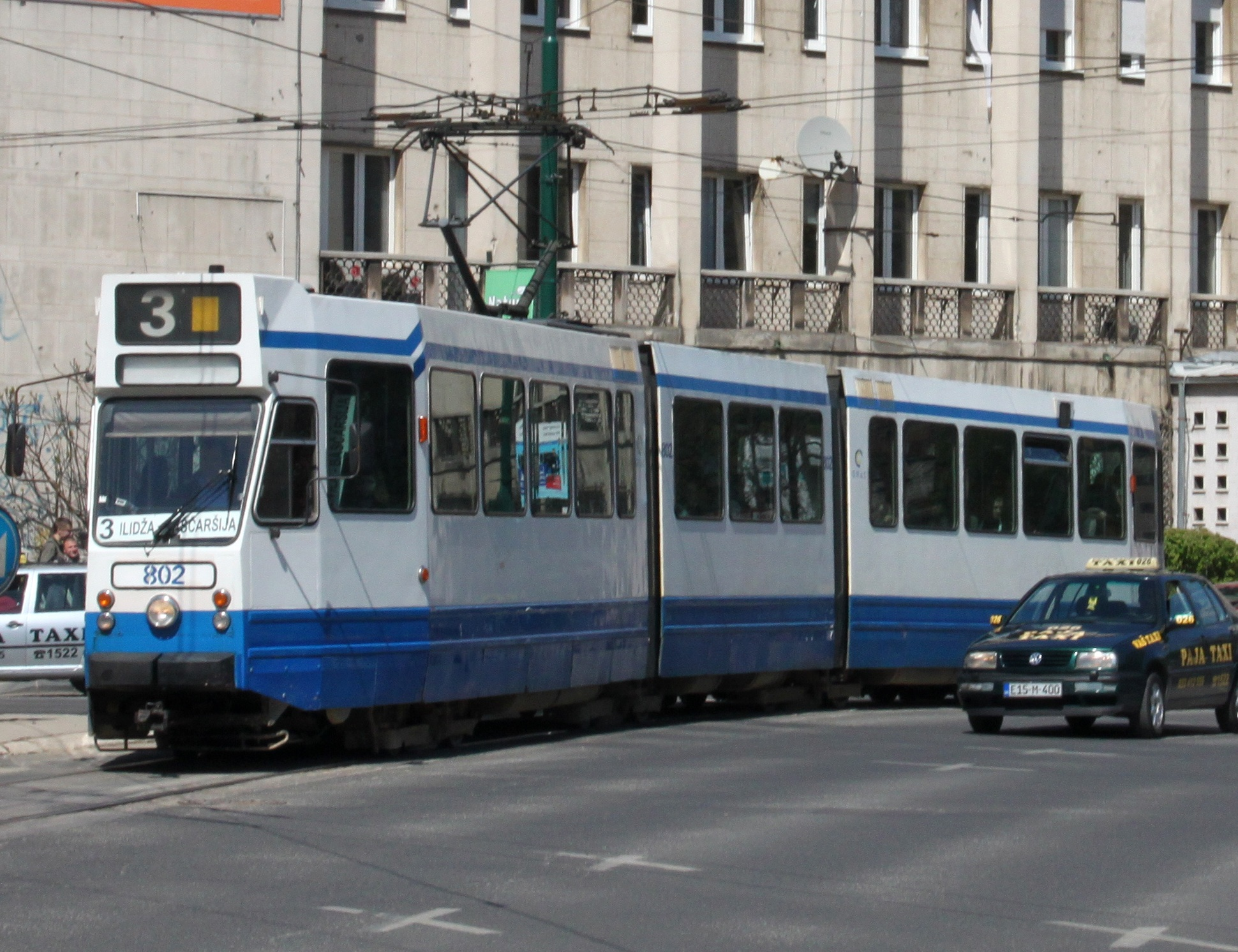
Former Amsterdam tram

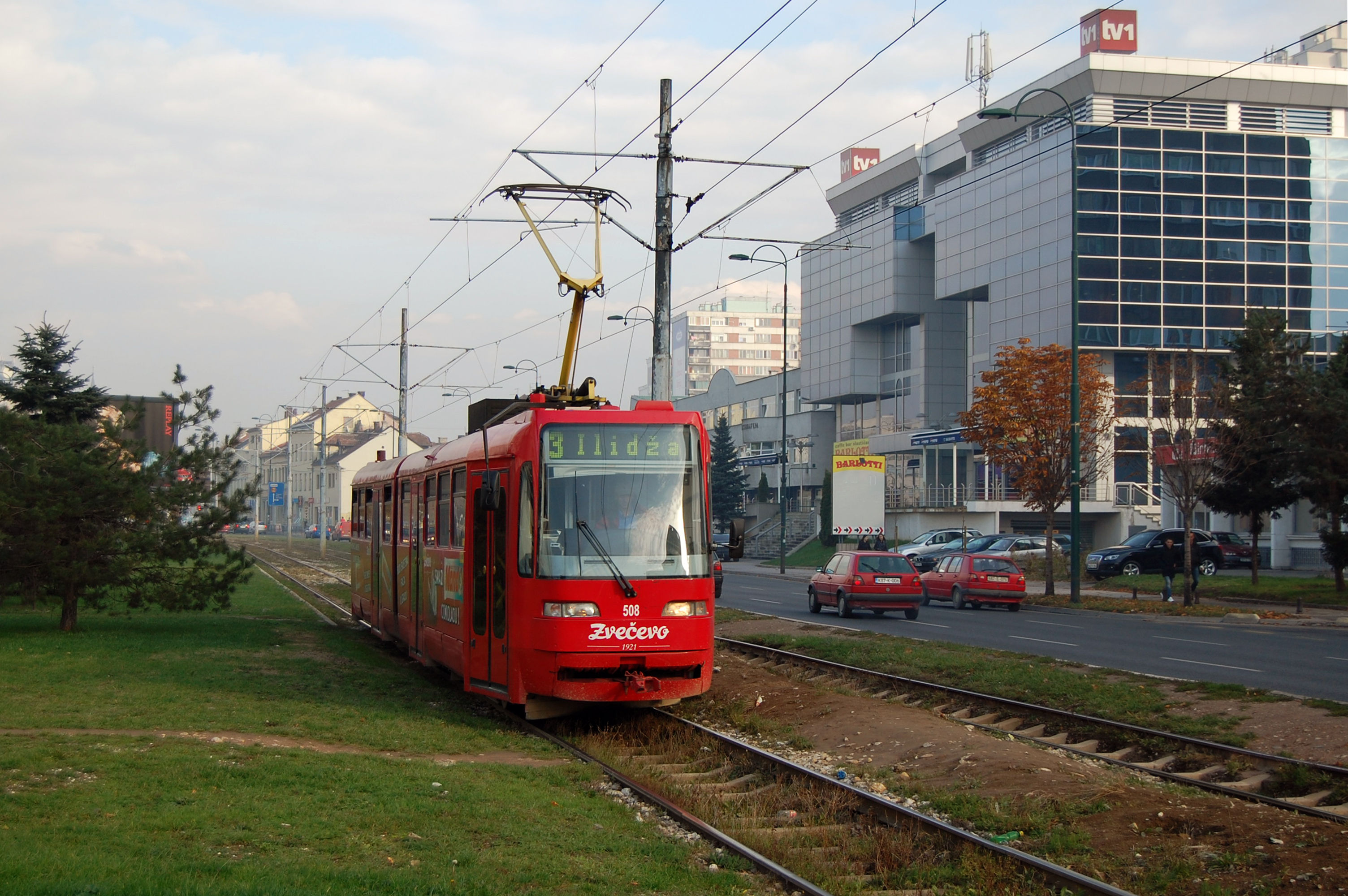
Satra II

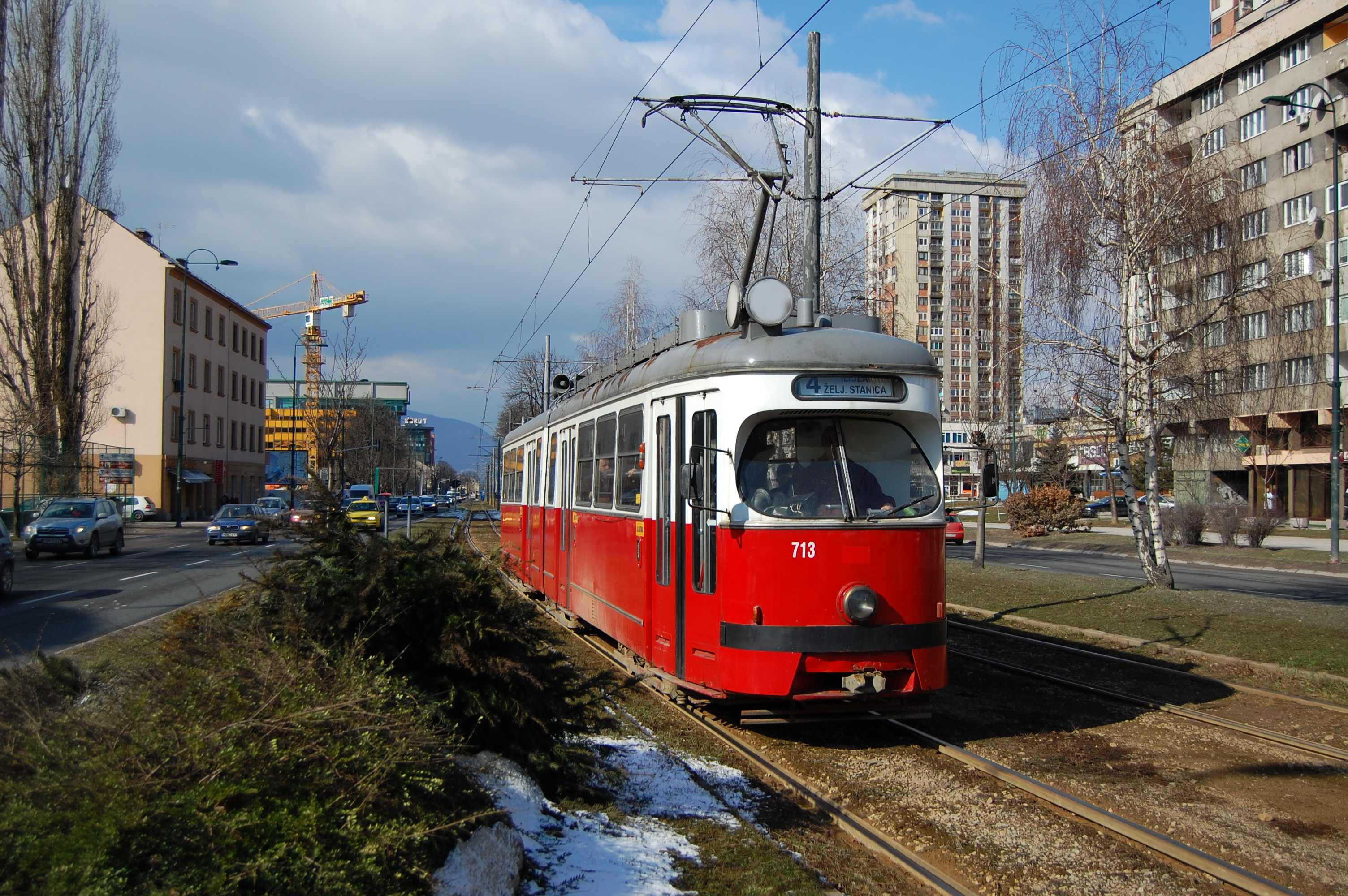
Tram #713, Line #4, 12 March 2012

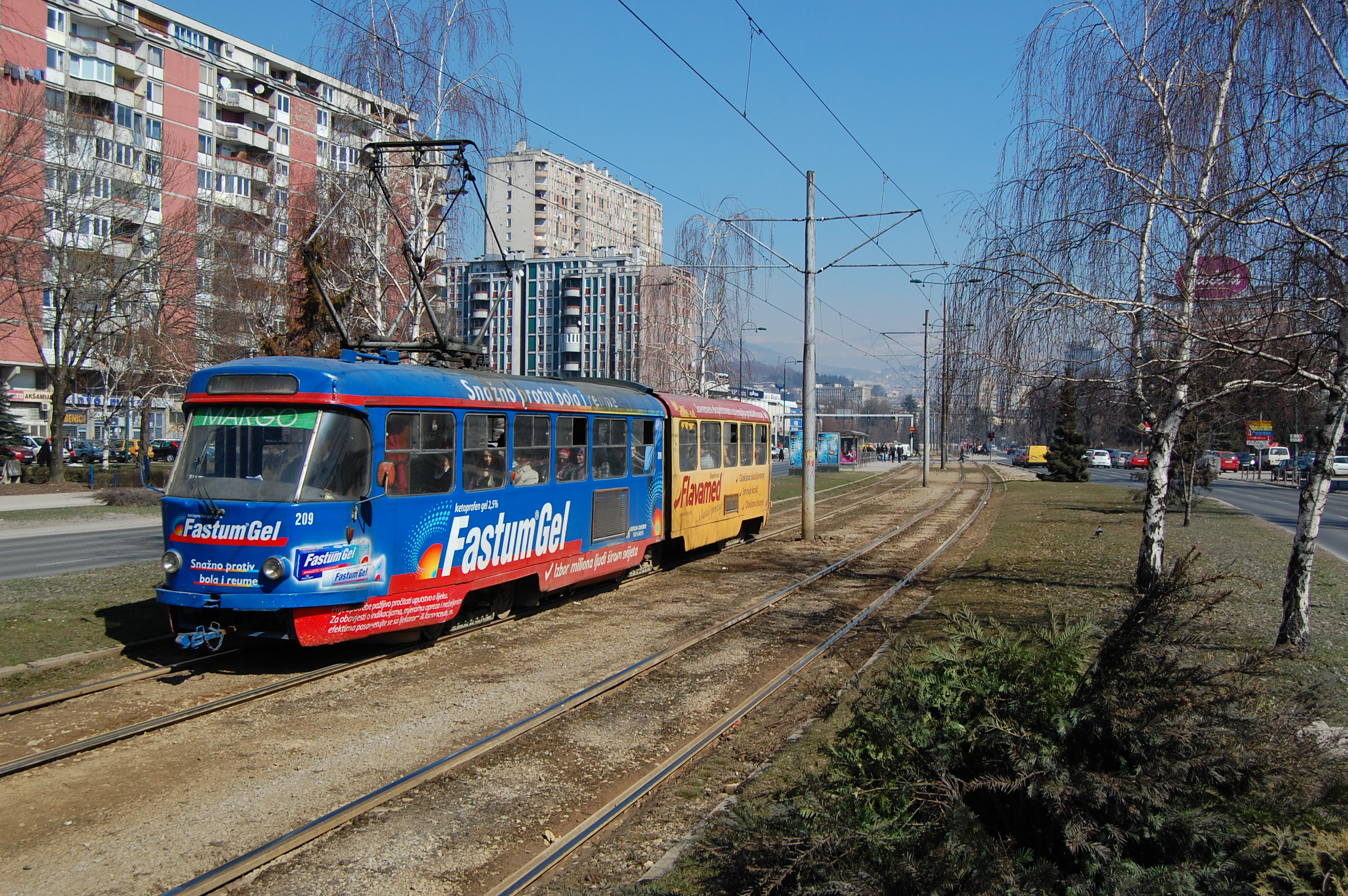
Tram #209, Line #3, 16 March 2012

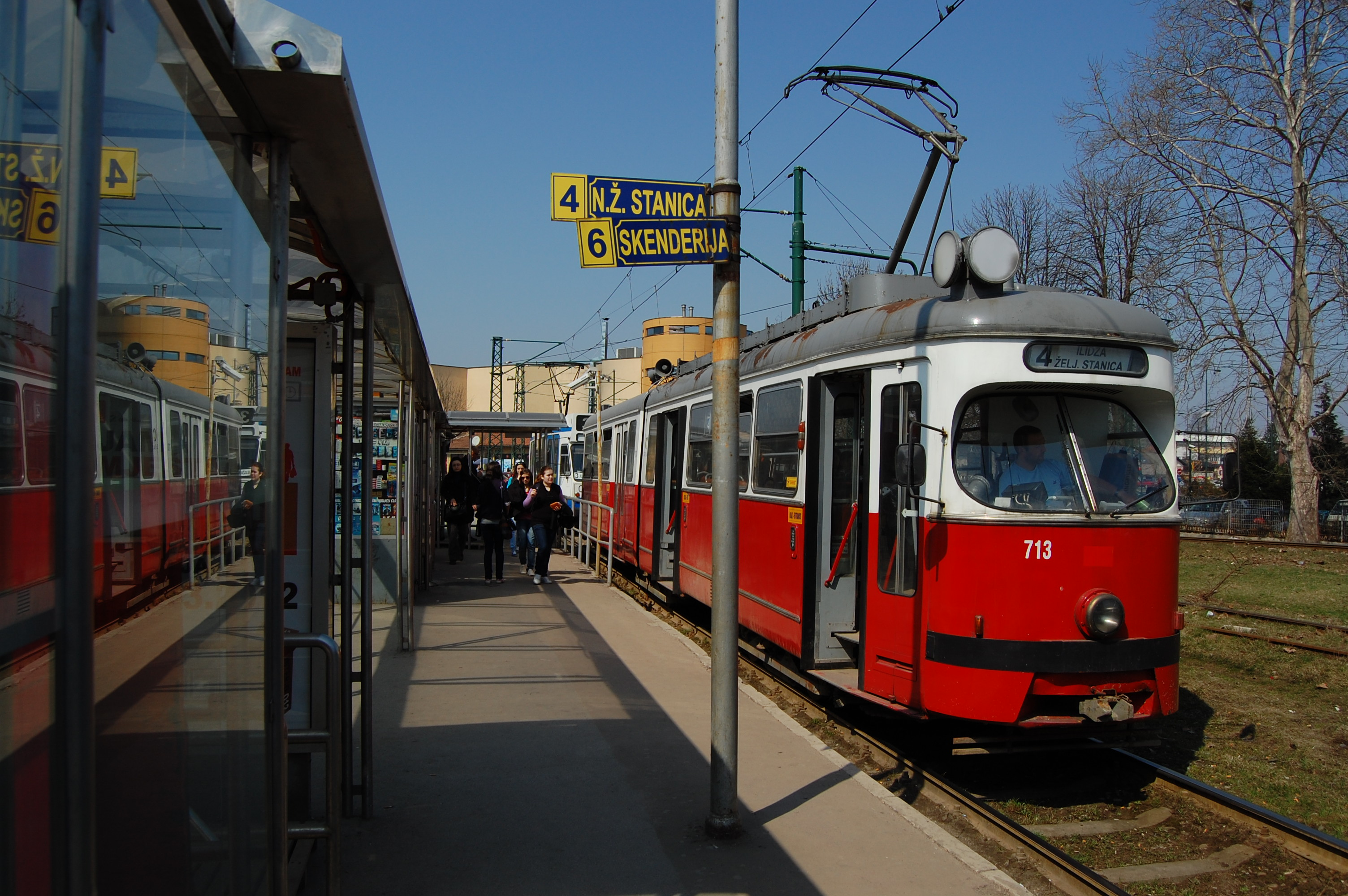
Ilidža tram terminus with #713 ready for departure to the Railroad Station

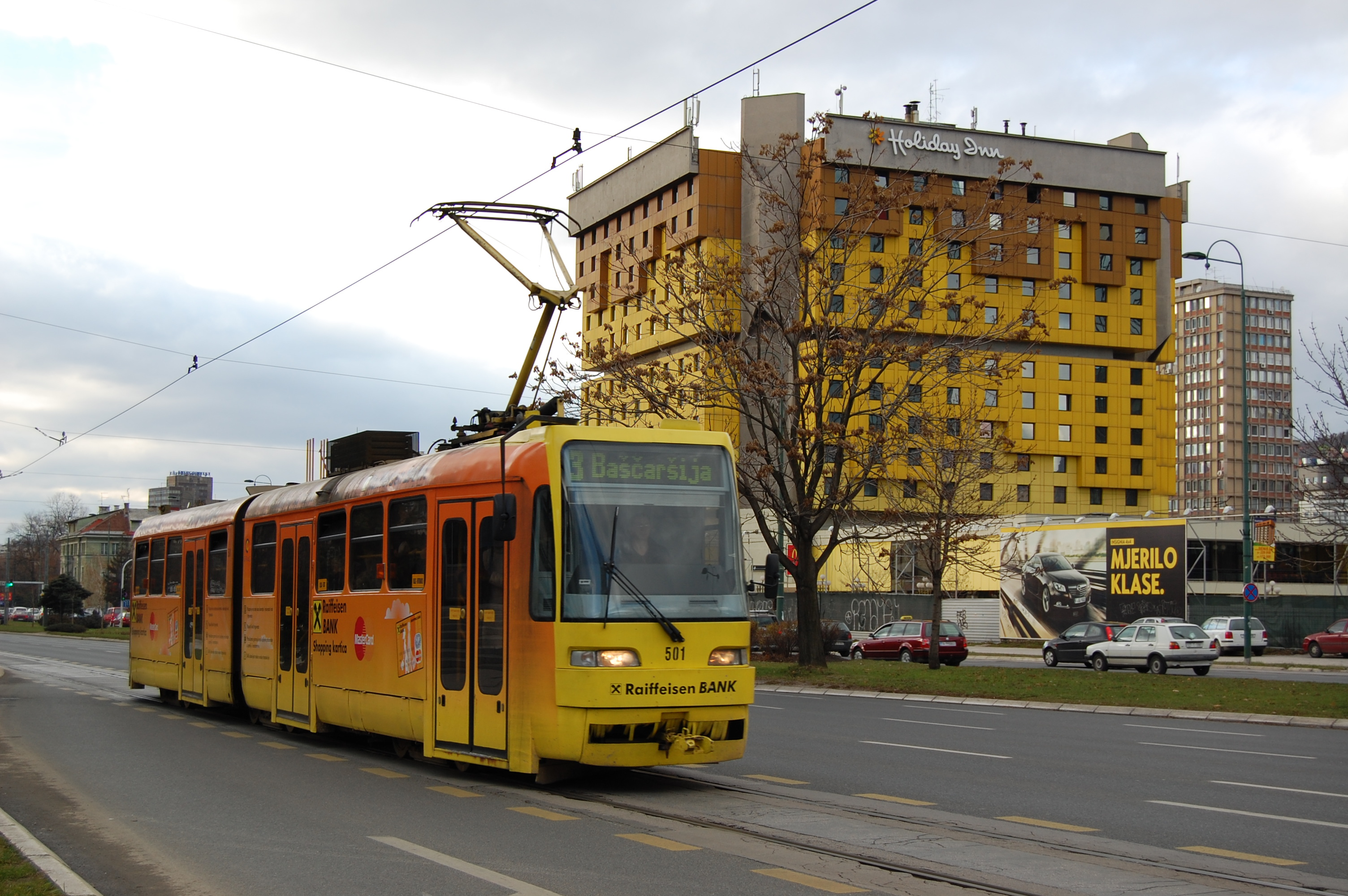
Tram #501, Line #3, 14 December 2011

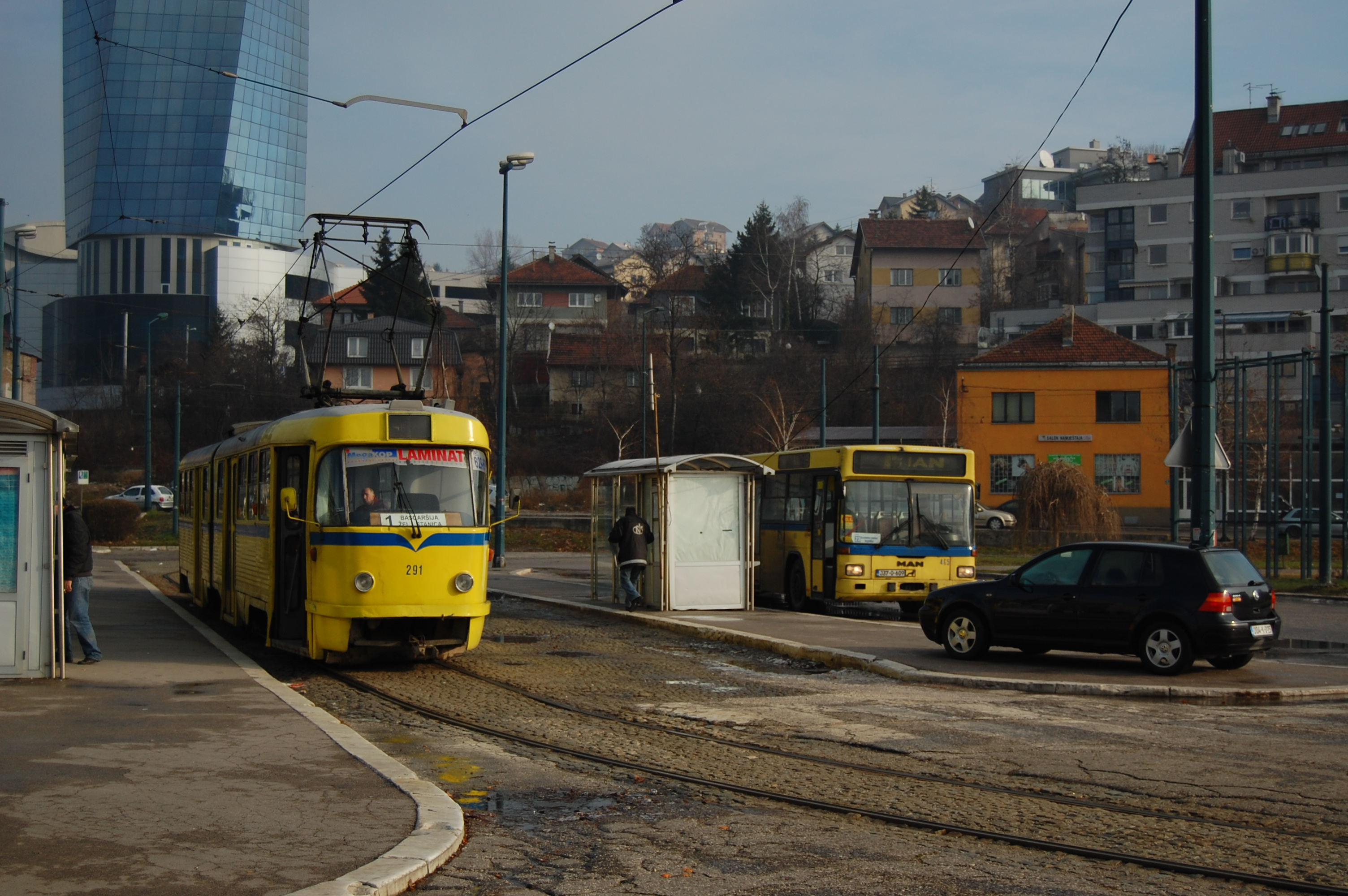
Tram #291, Line #1, 18 December 2011

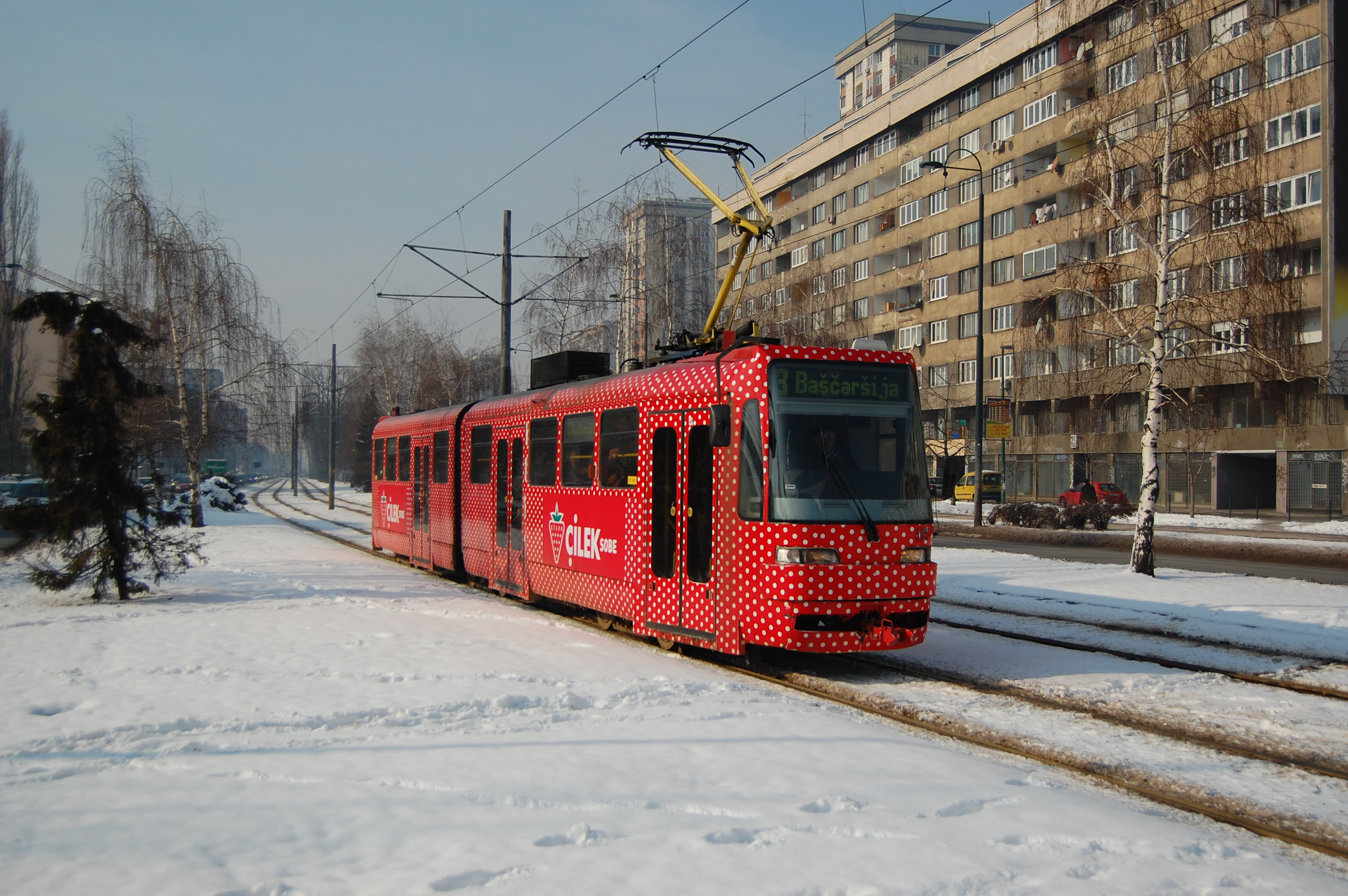
Tram #505, Line #3, 28 January 2012

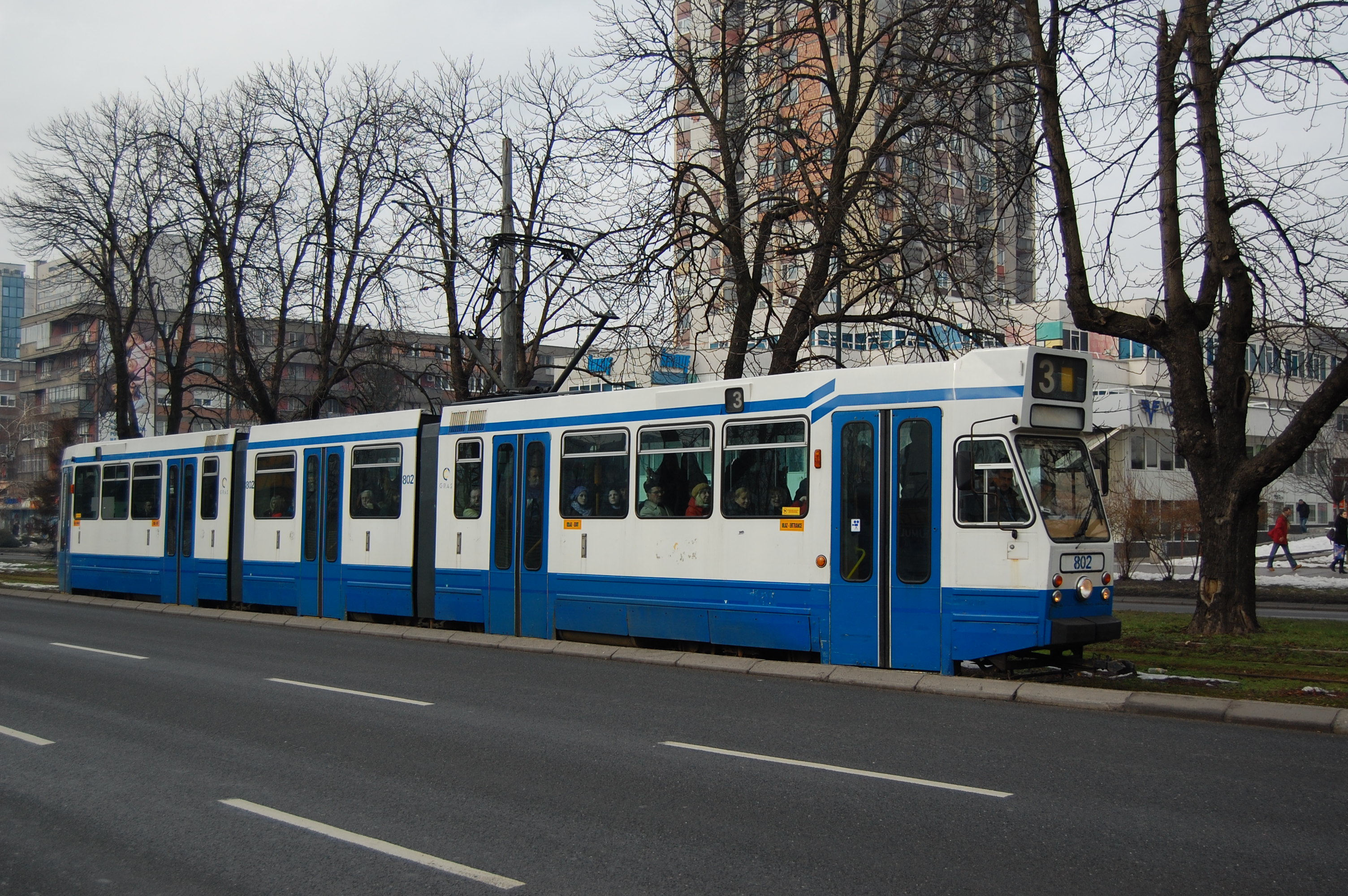
Tram #802, Line #3, 5 January 2012

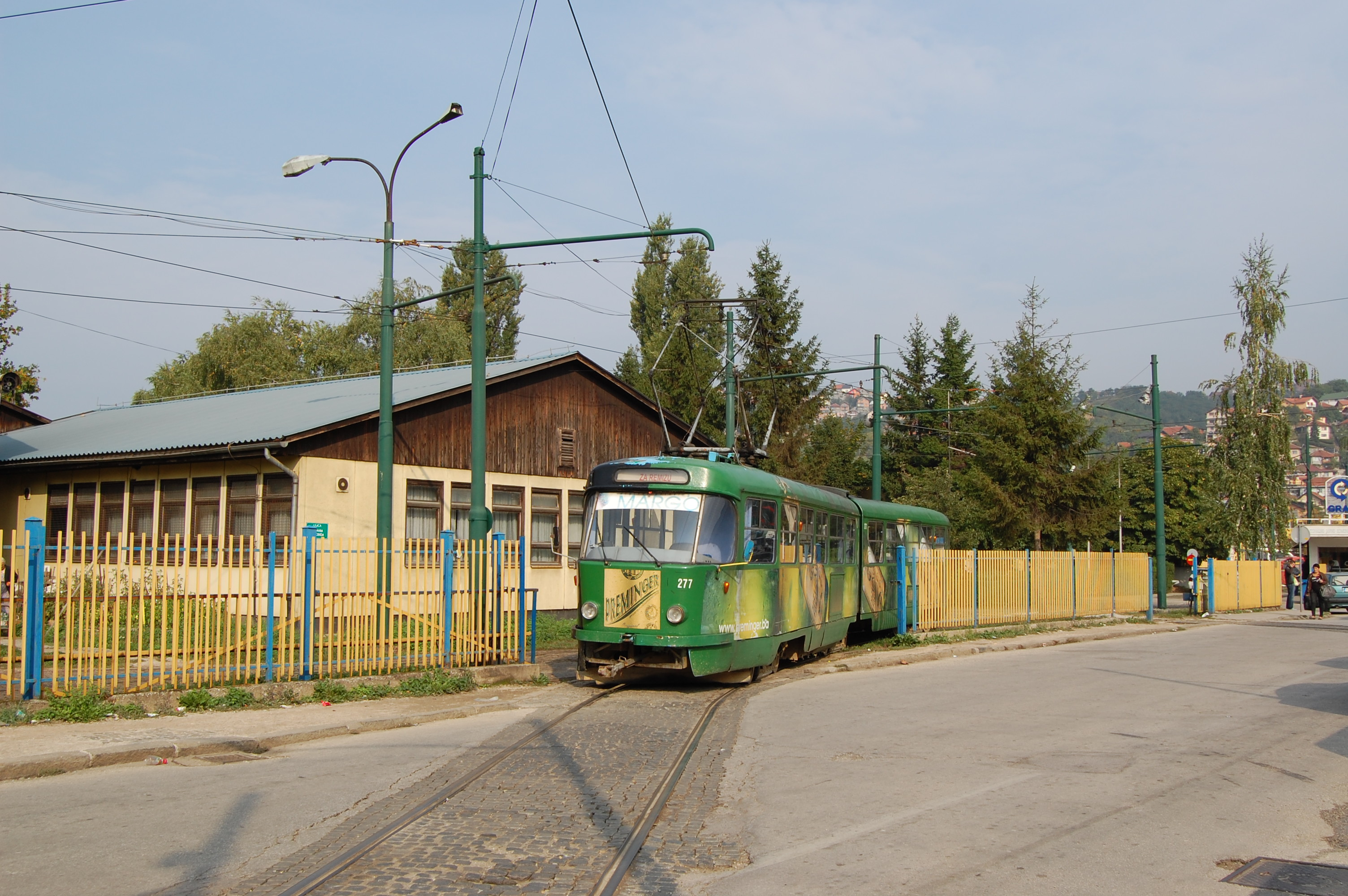
Tram #277 leaving the tram depot, 23 September 2011

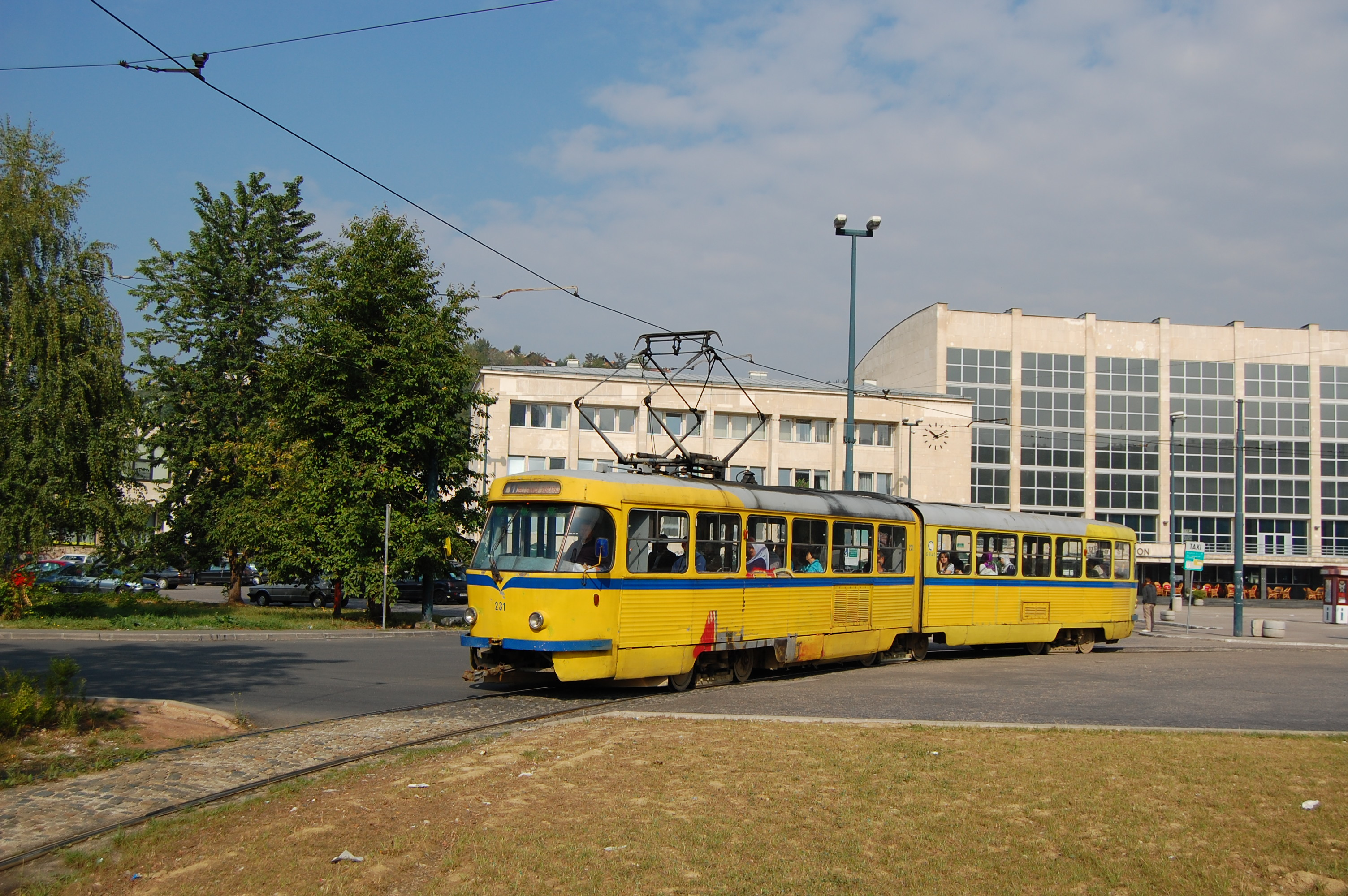
Tram #231, Line #1, 24 September 2011

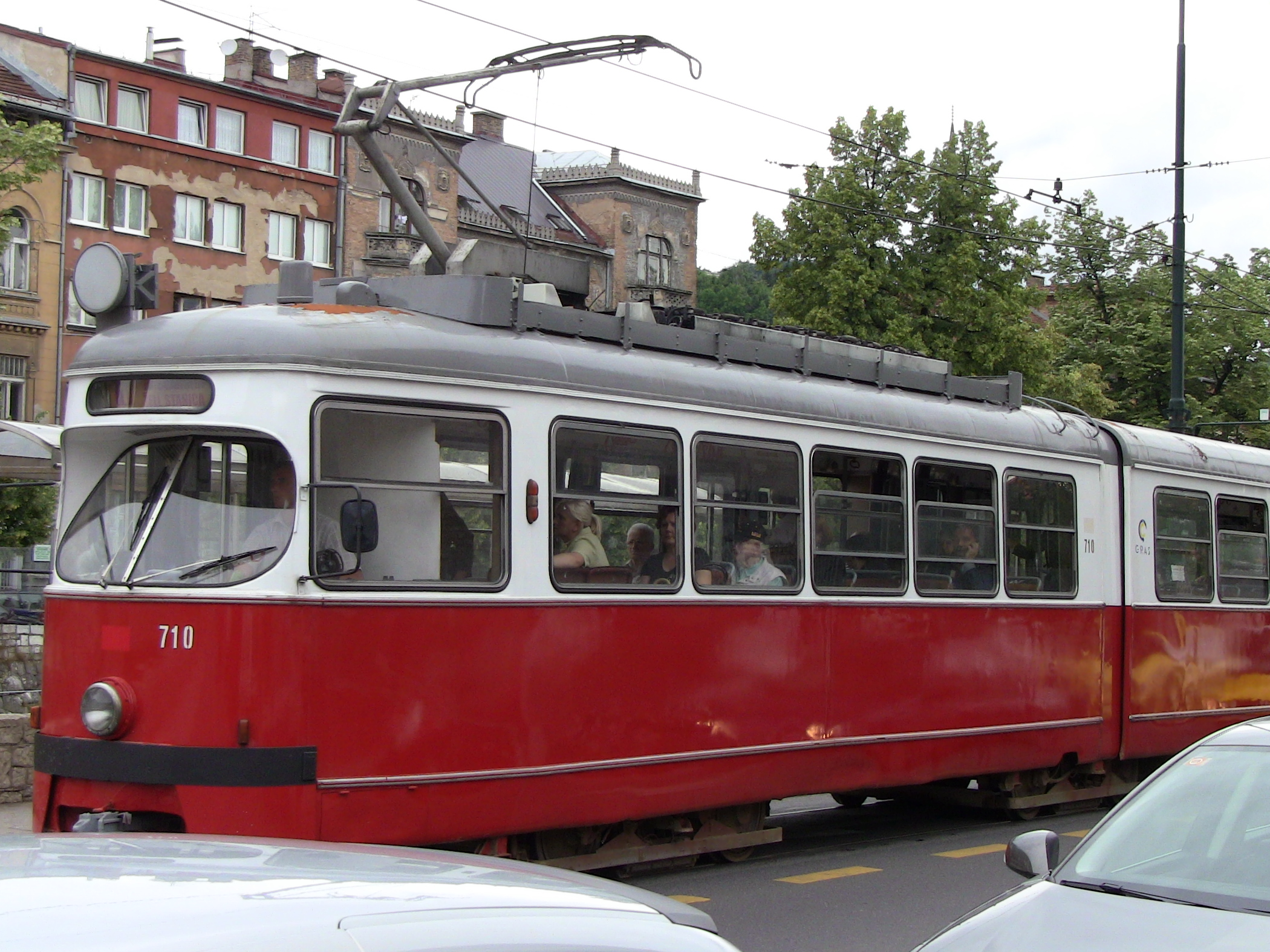
Tram #710 Sarajevo (in 2010)

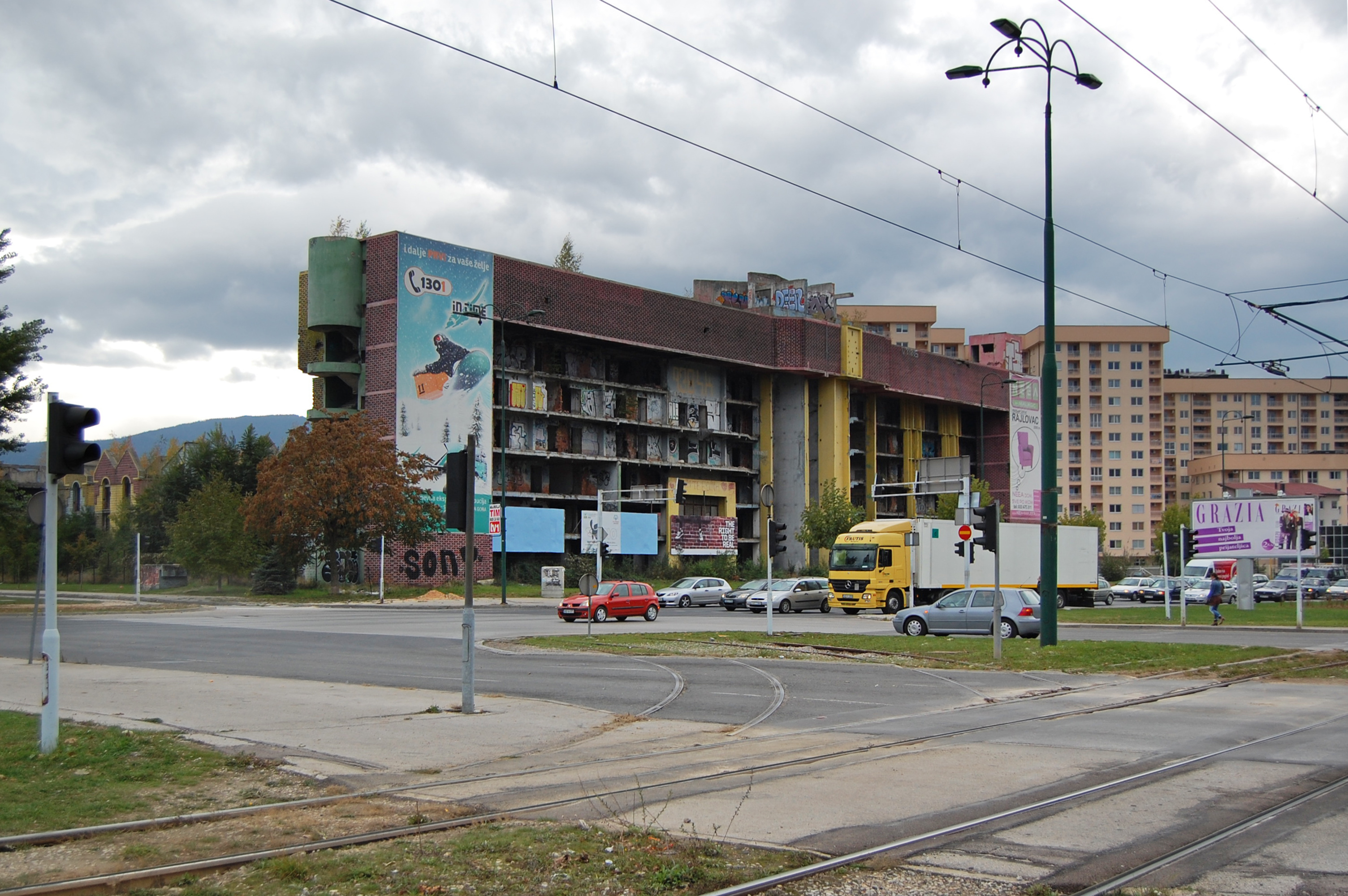
The remains of the planned extension to Dobrinja, in the background are the remains of the Sarajevo Retirement Home, which was very new at the time of the siege
Trams in Sarajevo map

Trams in Sarajevo map

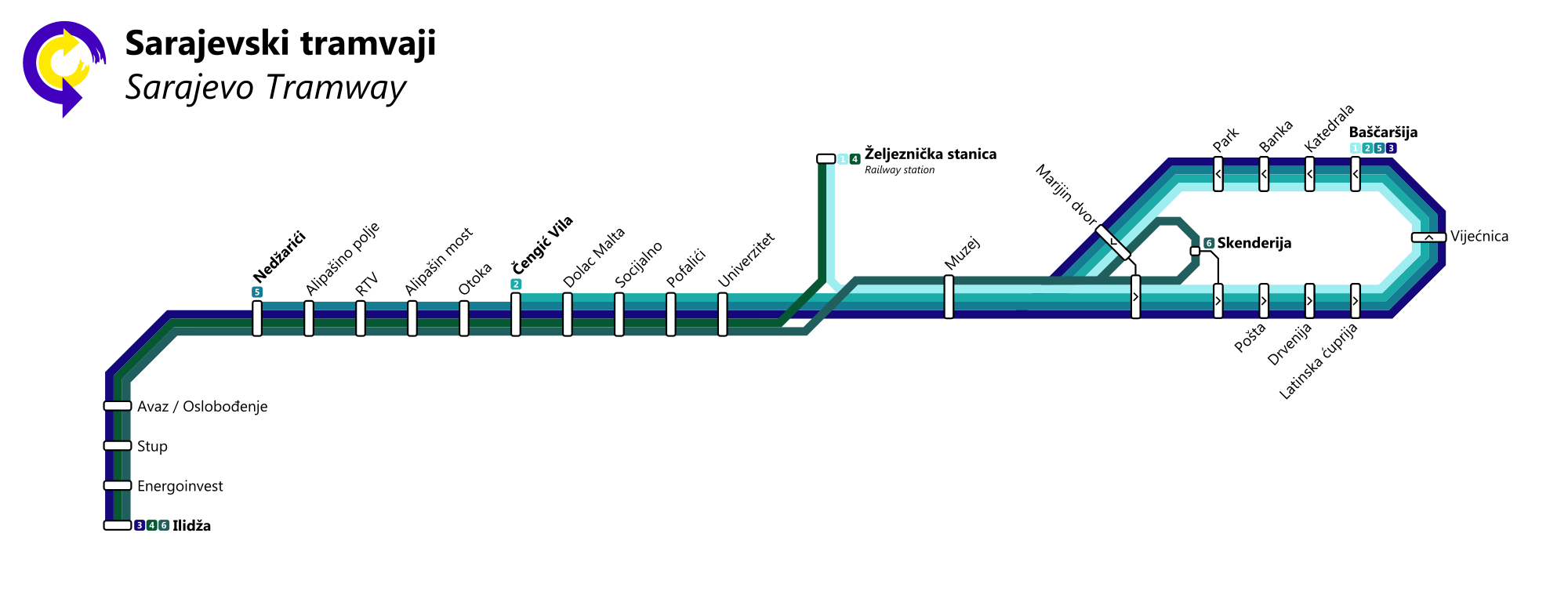
The unofficial Sarajevo tram network map

== See also ==
- List of tram and light rail transit systems
- Trams in Europe
- 2026 Sarajevo tram derailment
