= Nijaz Duraković Park =

Park in Sarajevo, Bosnia and Herzegovina

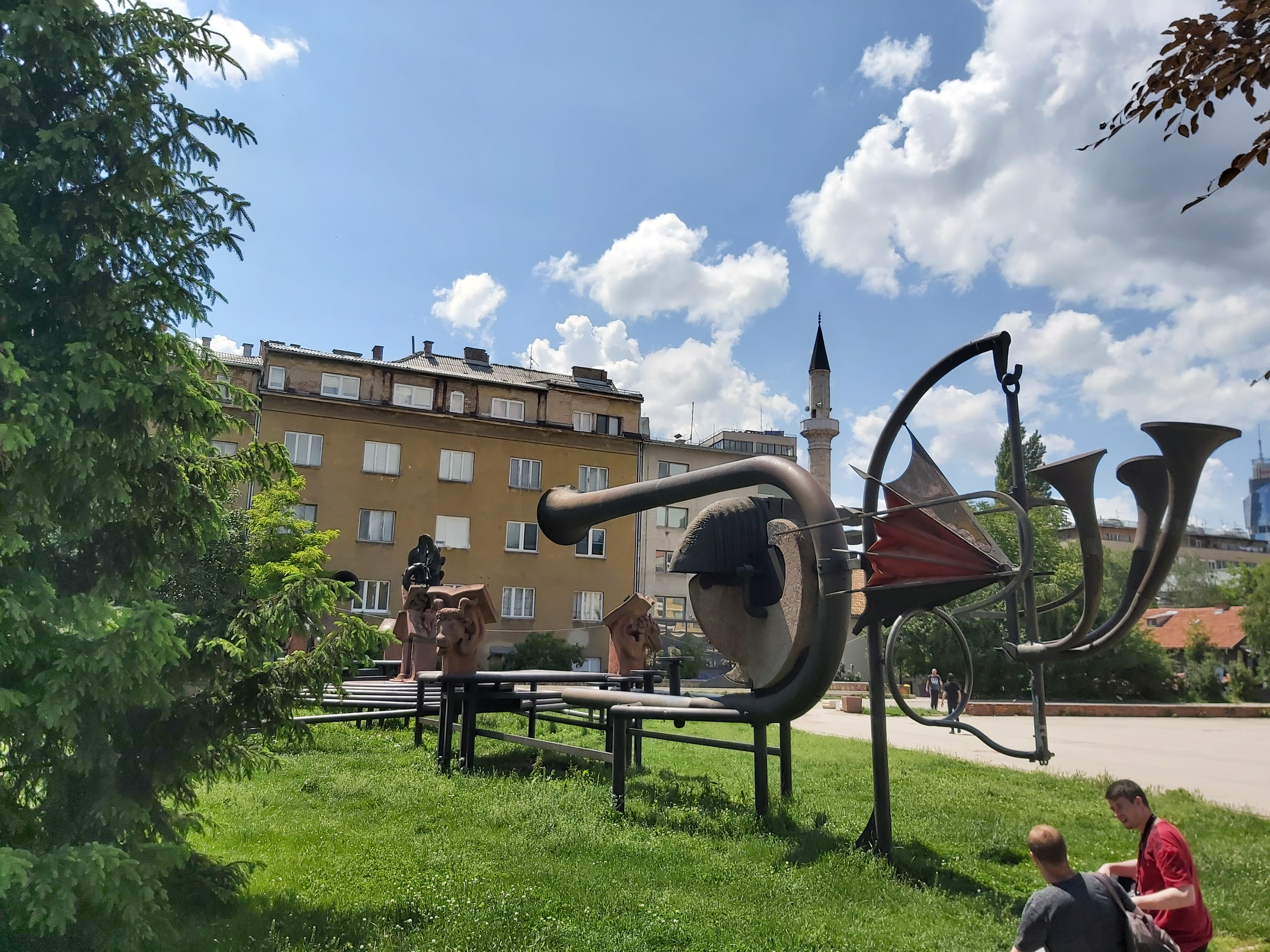
- "Star Trek" art installation by Helmut Lutz

- Location within Bosnia and Herzegovina
- Interactive map of Nijaz Duraković Park
- Location: Sarajevo
- Coordinates: 43°51′26.59″N 18°24′36.58″E

The Nijaz Duraković Park, formerly and also known as Hastahana, is a park located in Marijin Dvor neighborhood in Centar municipality of Sarajevo, Bosnia and Herzegovina.

== History ==
The park is located close to the Magribija mosque in Marijin Dvor. Hastahana means hospital in Turkish, and the place hosted an old hospital during Ottoman times, originally property of Gazi Husrev-beg's endowment (vakuf). In the 1960s the site was used as a Yugoslav military hospital, and during the siege of Sarajevo the open-air lot was cultivated as a vegetable garden.

Since 1999, the regulatory plan of Sarajevo envisaged the construction on the site of a museum of the city. However this never happened, due to lack of funding.

Since 2005, the park hosted the artistic installation "Star Trek", donated by German artist Helmut Lutz, which had been installed in many other locations, including Rome, Athens, Jerusalem, Istanbul. The sculpture group was removed in August 2020 to allow the construction works.

In May 2018, the park was named after Bosnian intellectual and politician Nijaz Duraković.

In April 2019, the local council of Centar decided that the site would be redeveloped to host a building and underground parking, while remaining for 90% a green area. This led to protests of citizens in 2019–2020, led by the group "Jedan grad, Jedna borba" (One town, one fight.) supported by SDP BiH. On 25 September 2019, the municipal mayor of Centar, Nedžad Ajnadžić, and his SDA-SBB-GS-DF majority, voted to amend a regulatory plan for Marijin Dvor, to allow the construction of a multi-storey underground garage, art pavilion, local community premises and other facilities, instead of the surface parking lot accessible from Kranjčevićeva, neighbouring the Hastahana park. The plot was sell to the Central Bank of Bosnia and Herzegovina in November 2019 for 4.7 million BAM (2.5 million euro). In February 2021, the new municipal mayor of Centar, Srđan Mandić (Our Party), acknowledged that the construction works would go ahead on the plot owned by the Central Bank.

Every year, several social events like "Summer in Hastahana Park" and "Sarajevo Holiday Market" are organized in the park.
