= Marijin Dvor (Sarajevo) =

Marijin Dvor Маријин Двор
- Neighborhood
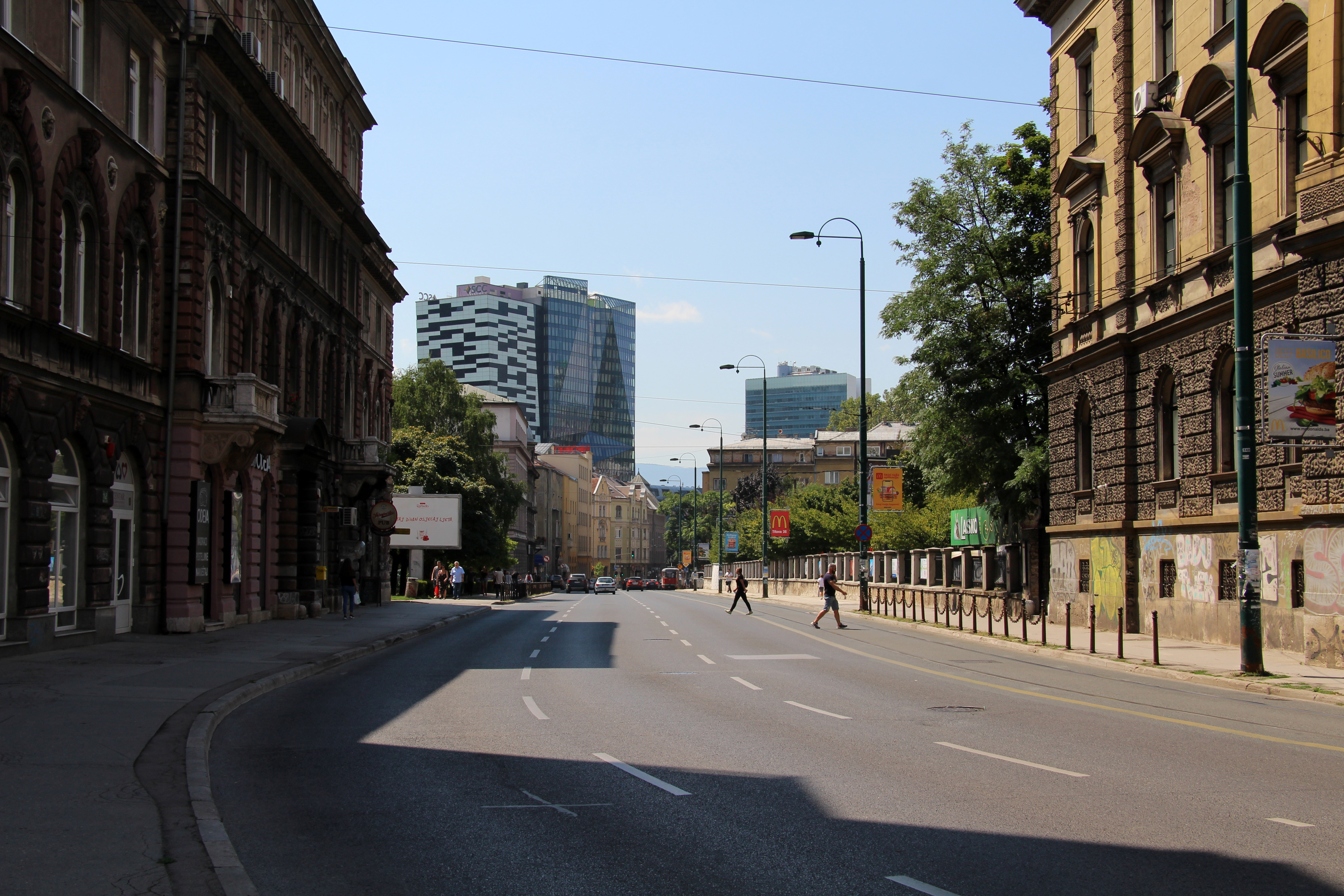
- Hiseta street leading to Marijin Dvor
- Interactive map of Marijin Dvor
- Coordinates: 43.8534°N 18.3995°E
- Country: Bosnia and Herzegovina
- entity: F BiH
- Canton: Sarajevo
- City: Sarajevo
- Municipality: Centar Municipality, Sarajevo
- Neighborhood: Marijin Dvor
- Time zone: UTC+1 (CET)
  - Summer (DST): UTC+2 (CEST)
- Area code: +387

Marijin Dvor or Marindvor (Cyrillic: Маријин Двор or Мариндвор; English: Mary's Palace) is a neighborhood and local community in Sarajevo, Bosnia and Herzegovina.

The neighborhood is noted for buildings from the Austro-Hungarian Empire era.

In the neighborhood are several significant buildings; National Museum of Bosnia and Herzegovina, Holiday Inn Sarajevo, UNITIC World Trade Towers, Sarajevo City Center, Greece–Bosnia and Herzegovina Friendship Building (old Parliament building pre-1992), Hastahana and others.

The Holiday Inn Sarajevo was the home of foreign correspondents during the 1984 Winter Olympics and throughout the siege of Sarajevo during the Bosnian War.

The UNITIC Twin Skyscrapers were built in the 1980s. They were colloquially named "Momo and Uzeir" after two characters from a radio comedy show, a Serb and a Bosniak. The towers were heavily damaged by shelling during the siege but remained standing, becoming symbols of resilience. They were renovated after the war.
