= Koševski Potok =

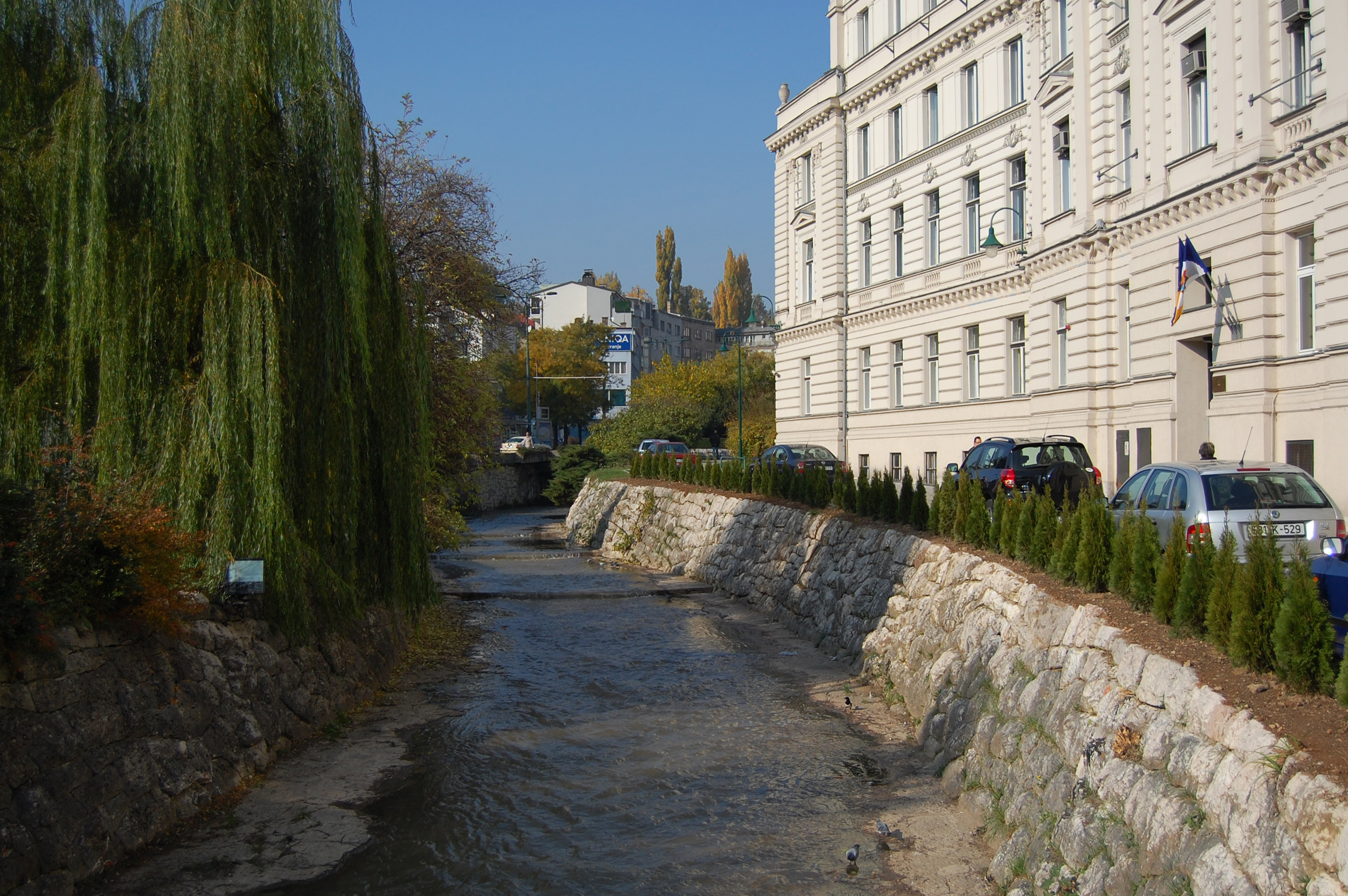
- Koševski Potok runs next to the Sarajevo Canton Building

- Location within Bosnia and Herzegovina

Location
- Country: Bosnia and Herzegovina
- Municipality: Centar Sarajevo

Physical characteristics
- Source: Nahorevski Potok and Grončavica creek
  - location: Kokorevac, Nahorevo
  - coordinates: 43.9067379°N 18.4132549°E
- Mouth: Miljacka
  - location: Skenderija neighborhood in Sarajevo
  - coordinates: 43.8561809°N 18.4133461°E
- Length: ca. 8 kilometres (5.0 mi)
- Discharge
  - location: Skenderija (confluence w/t Miljacka)
  - average: 2.5 cubic metres per second (88 cu ft/s)

Basin features
- Progression: Miljacka→ Bosna→ Sava→ Danube→ Black Sea
- River system: Bosna
- Landmarks: Pionirska Dolina
- Tributaries
  - left: Lučica, Grončavica creek, Kukin Potok, Ljuti Potok, Brekin Potok
  - right: Nahorevski Potok

Koševski Potok is a river in Sarajevo, Bosnia and Herzegovina. The river is partially subterranean, as a significant portion of its course passes through long box culvert, covering the river in a man-made structure and diversion project, designed for gaining space for urban development since the late 1940s and early 1950s.

== Headwaters ==
The Koševski Potok originates from a confluence of two smaller creeks in the region of Nahorevo neighbourhood, on the northern outskirts of Sarajevo, Nahorevski Potok and Grončavica creek (itself continuation of sinking creek called Grabovica which runs between plateaus of Crepoljsko and Biosko), draining from plateaus of Bukovik, Crepoljsko and Biosko, southeastern and southern slopes of Ozren mountain. Uroševo Vrelo, abundant wellspring is located in the area.

== Subterranean section ==
The Koševski Potok enters the urban area of Sarajevo from the north, between Pionirska Dolina recreation park and neighbourhood of Koševo, and at that point is diverted underground. From this point Koševski Potok is underground and it runs through the urban area of Sarajevo all the way to Skenderija neighbourhood, where it meets the Miljacka river near the Sarajevo Canton Building.

The stream emerges from underground just below Zetra Olympic Hall, and runs through open space for about 100 meters, before enters culvert again. Some 100 meters before the confluence with the Miljacka, Koševski Potok emerges from it within a public park where the Sarajevo Canton Building is situated, just a few meters below the Ali Pasha Mosque. It runs through the park and enters culvert once more for the last 30 or so meters, running under the one of city's main street before empties into the Miljacka.
