= Radava (Centar-Sarajevo) =

- Village
- Location within Bosnia and Herzegovina
- Country: Bosnia and Herzegovina
- Entity: Federation of Bosnia and Herzegovina
- Canton: Sarajevo
- Municipality: Centar Sarajevo

Area
  - Total: 1.10 sq mi (2.84 km^{2})

Population (2013)
  - Total: 1,296
  - Density: 1,180/sq mi (456/km^{2})
- Time zone: UTC+1 (CET)
  - Summer (DST): UTC+2 (CEST)

Radava is a township in the Centar municipality, part of the city Sarajevo, Federation of Bosnia and Herzegovina, Bosnia and Herzegovina.

== Demographics ==
Radava
year of census	1991.	1981.	1971.
Serbs	782 (55,07%)	716 (53,11%)	574 (55,45%)
Muslims	481 (33,87%)	482 (35,75%)	406 (39,22%)
Croats	8 (0,56%)	17 (1,26%)	14 (1,35%)
Yugoslavs	67 (4,71%)	114 (8,45%)	15 (1,44%)
others and unknown	82 (5,77%)	19 (1,40%)	26 (2,51%)
total	1.420	1.348	1.035

According to the 2013 census, its population was 1,296.

Ethnicity in 2013
Ethnicity	Number	Percentage
Bosniaks	1,169	90.2%
Serbs	59	4.6%
Croats	5	0.4%
other/undeclared	63	4.9%
Total	1,296	100%
