= Poljine =

- Village
- Location within Bosnia and Herzegovina
- Coordinates: 43°54′N 18°24′E
- Country: Bosnia and Herzegovina
- Entity: Federation of Bosnia and Herzegovina
- Canton: Sarajevo
- Municipality: Centar Sarajevo

Area
  - Total: 0.89 sq mi (2.31 km^{2})

Population (2013)
  - Total: 203
  - Density: 228/sq mi (87.9/km^{2})
- Time zone: UTC+1 (CET)
  - Summer (DST): UTC+2 (CEST)

Poljine is a neighborhood in Centar municipality, Sarajevo, the capital of Bosnia and Herzegovina.

== History ==
During the 1992–1995 Siege of Sarajevo, Serb forces positioned heavy artillery in the area and continually bombed the city below. Several attempts were made by Bosnian Muslim forces to break the siege in Poljine, with varying success.

Today, Poljine is generally considered one of the wealthiest parts of Sarajevo, and is the site of numerous villas and mansions owned by the members of the city's plutocracy.

== Demographics ==
=== Ethnic composition, 1991 census ===
Total: 161

- Serbs - 141 (87.57%)
- ethnic Muslims - 10 (6.21%)
- Croats - 3 (1.86%)
- Yugoslavs - 2 (1.24%)
- others and unknown - 5 (3.10%)

According to the 2013 census, its population was 203.

Ethnicity in 2013
Ethnicity	Number	Percentage
Bosniaks	180	88.7%
Serbs	1	0.5%
other/undeclared	22	10.8%
Total	203	100%
