= Mrkovići =

Village in Federation of Bosnia and Herzegovina

- Village
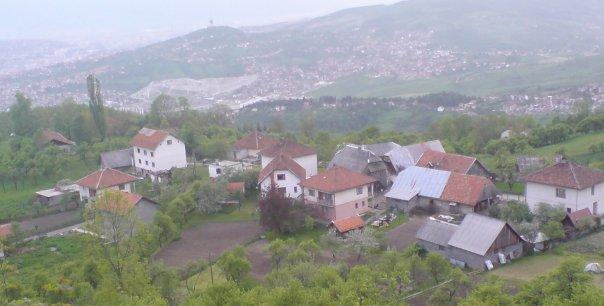
- Mrkovići
- Interactive map of Mrkovići
- Location within Bosnia and Herzegovina
- Coordinates: 43°54′N 18°26′E
- Country: Bosnia and Herzegovina
- Entity: Federation of Bosnia and Herzegovina
- Canton: Sarajevo
- Municipality: Centar Sarajevo

Area
  - Total: 1.45 sq mi (3.76 km^{2})

Population (2013)
  - Total: 55
  - Density: 38/sq mi (15/km^{2})
- Time zone: UTC+1 (CET)
  - Summer (DST): UTC+2 (CEST)

Mrkovići is a village, and together with the Hrastovi neighbourhood constitute the local community Hrastovi-Mrkovići, in Centar municipality, in Sarajevo, Federation of Bosnia and Herzegovina, Bosnia and Herzegovina.

== Demographics ==
=== Ethnic composition, 1991 census ===
total: 232

- Serbs - 229 (98.70%)
- "Yugoslavs" - 1 (0.43%)
- others and unknown - 2 (0.86%)

According to the 2013 census, its population was 55.

Ethnicity in 2013
| Ethnicity | Number | Percentage |
|---|---|---|
| Serbs | 45 | 81.8% |
| Bosniaks | 10 | 18.2% |
| Total | 55 | 100% |
