= Jelićeva Theatre =

Theatre in Sarajevo, Bosnia and Herzegovina

Coordinates: 43.8569°N 18.4208°E

- JU Centar kulture i mladih Općine Centar Sarajevo (Pozorište Jelićeva)
- Logo
- Interactive map of Jelićeva Theatre
- Address: Jelićeva 1, 71000 Sarajevo; Sarajevo; Bosnia and Herzegovina
- Owner: Center Municipality
- Capacity: 220

Construction
- Built: 1901
- Opened: 1965; 61 years ago
- Renovated: 1982, 2001, 2015

Website
- Official Website

The JU Center for Culture and Youth of the Center Municipality Sarajevo, commonly known as the Jelićeva Theatre, established by the Center Municipality in 1965, is an institution focused on enriching the lives of children, youth, and adults through a range of cultural and educational programs, with a particular emphasis on theatre and the performing arts.

== Description ==
While it offers diverse activities, the center's cornerstone is its theatre programming, which includes professional productions, experimental theatre, cabarets, stand-up comedy, monodrama, and performances for and by children. Since its founding, the center has worked closely with educational institutions, NGOs, humanitarian organizations, media, and other cultural professionals, creating spaces for artistic expression and fostering a strong sense of community and personal growth.

The center's programs primarily target children and youth, promoting their creativity while accommodating all community groups. Many programs have become cornerstone cultural events in Sarajevo and Bosnia and Herzegovina. Over the years, the center has received numerous accolades, including the “Plaque of the City of Sarajevo” and a UNICEF award for its work with children. In 2019, the Federal Ministry of Culture and Sports recognized it as an institution of significance for the Federation of Bosnia and Herzegovina. The center is also a signatory to an international cultural cooperation agreement among four countries, 20 cities, and cultural centers.

The center organizes various theatre festivals and performances that promote values such as freedom, creativity, equality, and environmental awareness. Signature festivals and plays like the “Children’s BH Festival ‘Hajde svijete budi dijete’” and performances such as Magareće godine, Čarobni kliker, and Princeza zemlja, zemljožderi i vitezovi are popular events that engage young audiences while encouraging imagination and creativity. These theatrical projects aim to introduce children to the performing arts and inspire them to explore other artistic forms, including literature, painting, music, and dance.

In addition to mainstream theatre, the center hosts alternative theatre projects such as “Rajvosa,” an experimental theatre collective that has operated for over twenty years and produced numerous plays, including Bosanska podvala and Moja žena se zove Zlatko. The performances have toured widely, both within Bosnia and Herzegovina and internationally in countries like Croatia, Slovenia, Sweden, and Albania.

The center also organizes the annual comedy festival Smijeh je lijek (“Laughter is the Best Medicine”), in its 23rd year as of 2024, to bring joy and humor to audiences in Sarajevo. Renowned actors such as Boris Dvornik, Zijah Sokolović, and Milan Gutović have graced the center's stage, contributing to the institution's legacy as a prominent cultural venue in the region.

In 2019 alone, the center hosted over 200 events, including 13 festivals, 75 theater performances, book promotions, concerts, film screenings, workshops, and seminars. Its theater stage, Jelićeva, presented 75 performances attended by more than 13,500 viewers, featuring both premieres and guest performances from Bosnia and the region. With over 300 students enrolled in various courses and schools, the center welcomed around 100,000 visitors that year.

The center also collaborates closely with non-governmental organizations and youth centers, initiating projects, workshops, and seminars to inspire youth engagement and support their full potential. Partnerships have been established with organizations like UNICEF, PRONI, UNDP, and the Erasmus program, as well as embassies from Romania, Spain, and Hungary. The center remains committed to new ideas and projects, aiming to expand its local and regional partnerships and connect Sarajevo with cultural networks worldwide. In 2020, Jelićeva Theatre celebrated its 55th anniversary, marking over half a century of contributions to Sarajevo's cultural scene and community development.
