= Ciglane =

Neighborhood of Sarajevo, Bosnia and Herzegovina

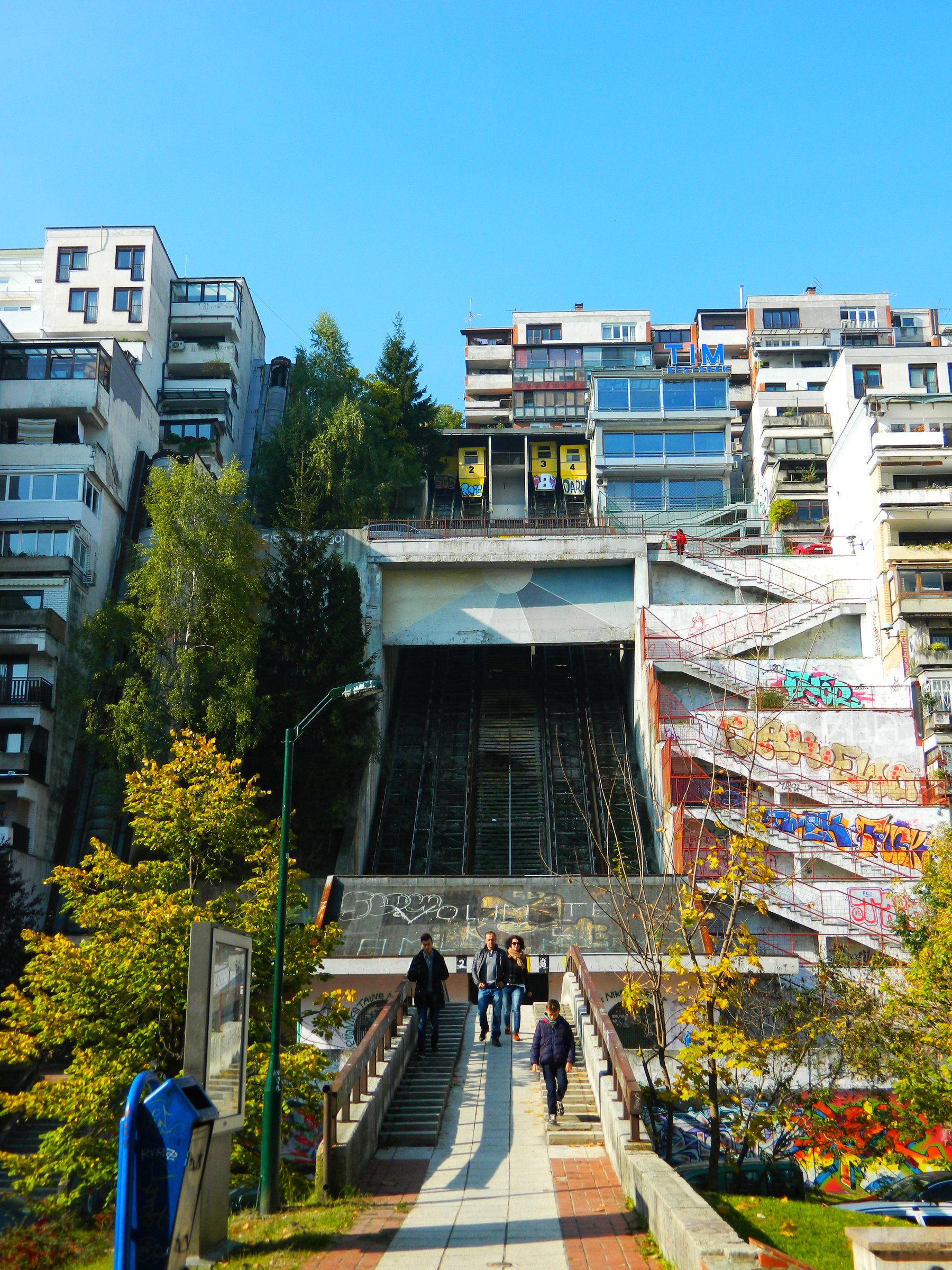
The Kosi Lift ("Slanted lift"), the only funicular in Sarajevo

Ciglane (Cyrillic: Циглане) is a neighborhood and local community in Sarajevo, Bosnia and Herzegovina, one of the 19 local communities in the Municipality of Centar Sarajevo. It was constructed on the Crni Vrh hill during the 1970s. Known for its brutalist design, it stands out from surrounding areas. It is also the only neighborhood in the city with its own funicular, called the Kosi Lift ("Slanted lift").

== Name ==
The name "Ciglane" comes from the Serbo-Croatian word for a brick factory, "Ciglana". It owes its name to a brick factory, opened by August Braun in 1879, which existed in this spot until 1973. (Note: From the source used, it is unclear whether the factory was in operation all the way until 1973.) The bricks from this factory were used to build many significant buildings in Sarajevo, like the Building of the Presidency of Bosnia and Herzegovina.

== Area ==
The Ciglane local community encompasses the following streets:

- Alipašina (numbers 47–55)
- Merhemića trg (1–15)
- Husrefa Redžića (1–22)
- Antuna Hangija (7–17)
- Avde Hume (1–25)
- Dajanli Ibrahim-bega (2–16)
- Hakije Kulenovića (1–42)

== Education ==
Although no schools are located in the Ciglane local community, students from this area are eligible to enroll either into the "Hasan Kikić" or "Mehmed-beg Kapetanović Ljubušak" elementary schools, based on their address.
