= Pionirska dolina =

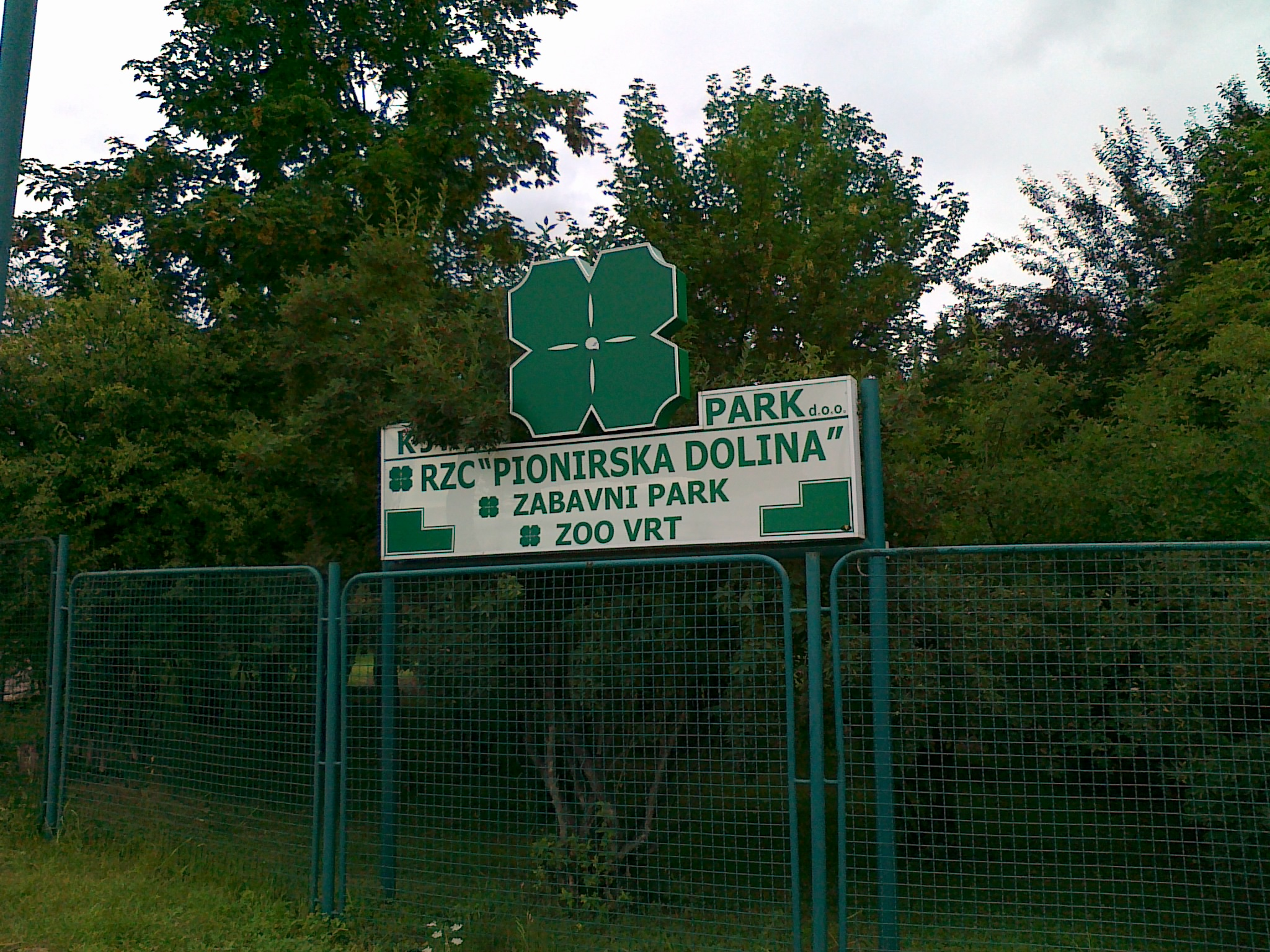

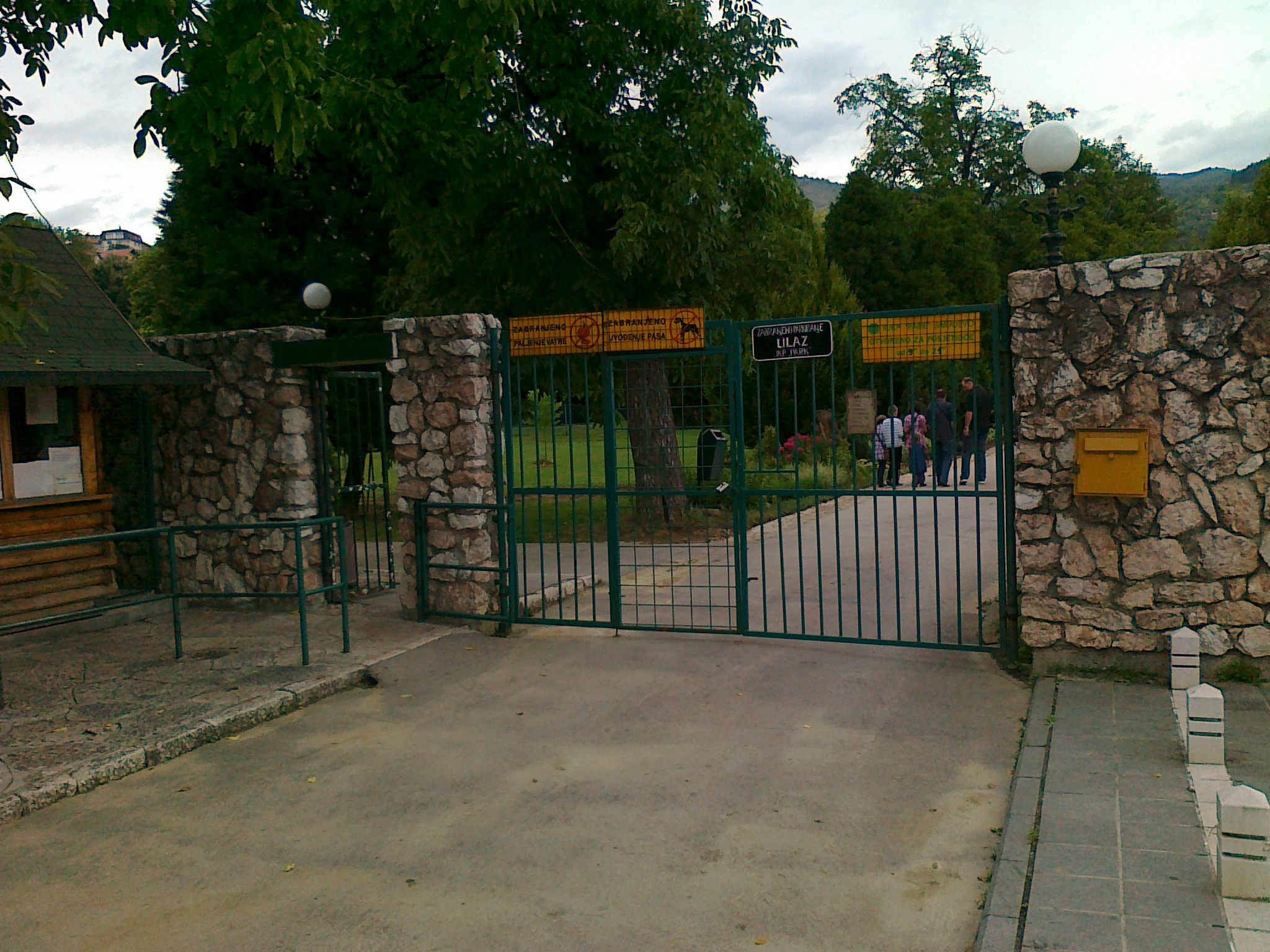
- Entrance to Pionirska dolina
- Interactive map of Pionirska dolina
- 43°52′39.41″N 18°24′42.65″E
- Location: Koševo, Sarajevo, Bosnia and Herzegovina
- Land area: 8.5 hectares (21 acres)
- No. of species: 59 (2021)
- Owner: KJKP Park
- Website: KJKP Park official site

Pioneer Valley (Bosnian, Croatian and Serbian: Pionirska dolina / Пионирска долина) is a recreational and entertainment center and zoo located in Koševo neighborhood, Sarajevo, Bosnia and Herzegovina.

== History ==
Recreation and entertainment center "Pioneer Valley" is the oldest zoo in Bosnia and Herzegovina. During Austro-Hungarian period it was located in Ilidža, but was later relocated to the municipality of Centar.

== Zoo ==
The zoo hosts 59 species of animals from all over the world.

In early 2012, Pionirska dolina hosted an exhibition with 52 dinosaurs, reconstructed by a German Palaeontological Research Center, under the strict supervision of the Paleontology museum in Hanover.

In February 2013, it was announced that two lions from Sofia Zoo would be donated to the Pionirska dolina zoo. A few days after the lions were donated in March 2013, a lioness died of E. coli.

== Gallery ==
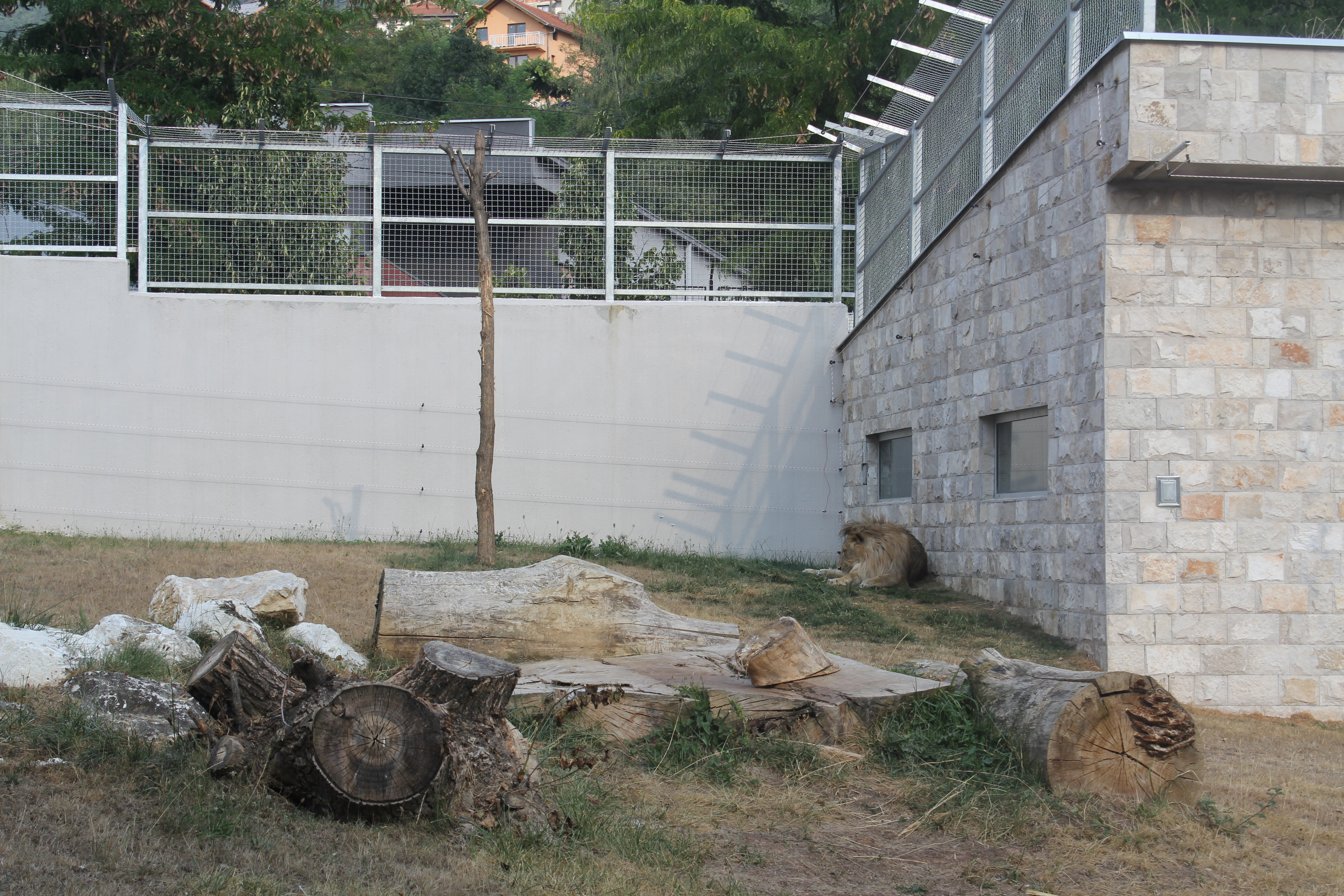
Lion

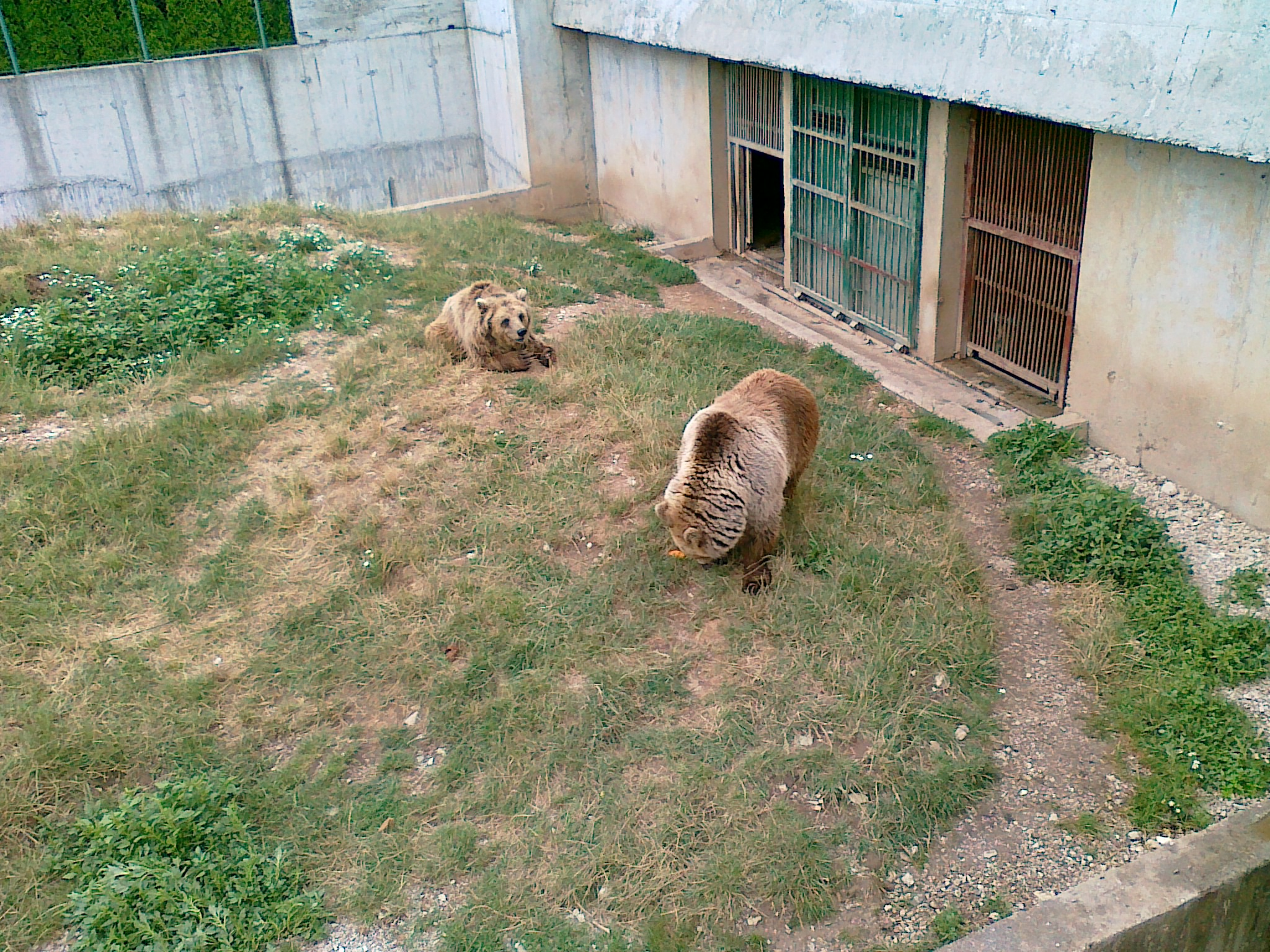
Brown bears

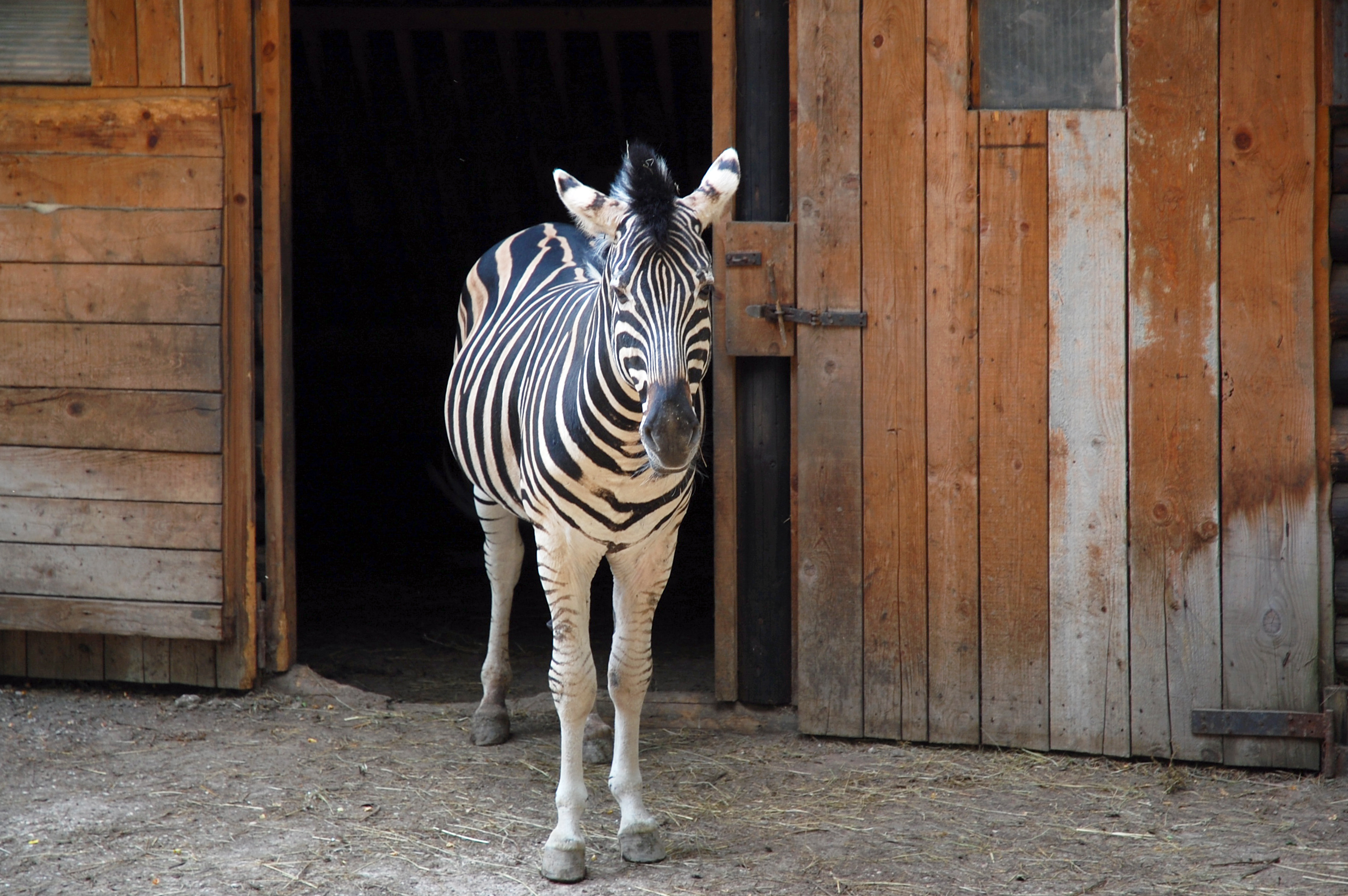
Zebra

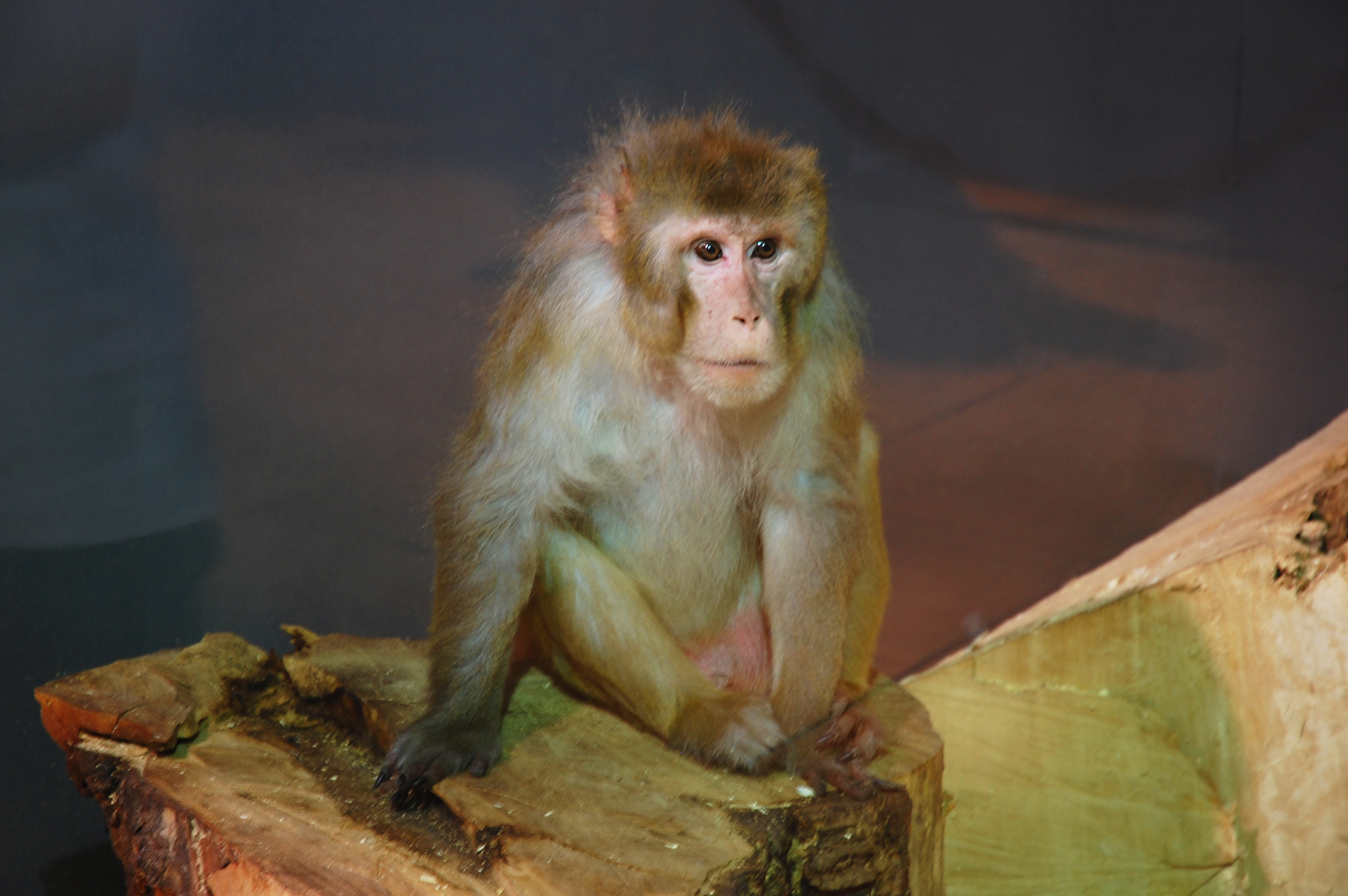
Rhesus macaque

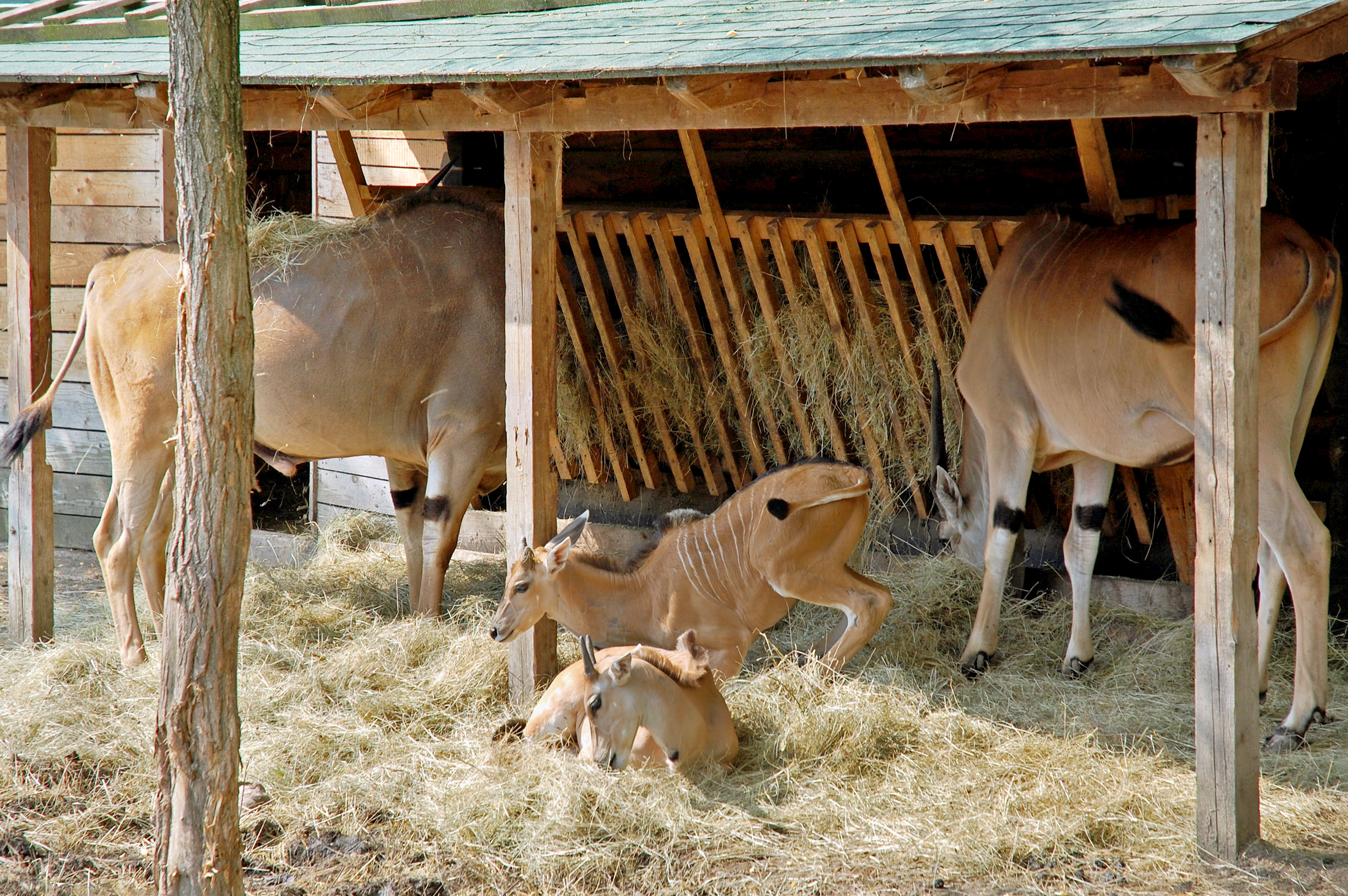
Common elands

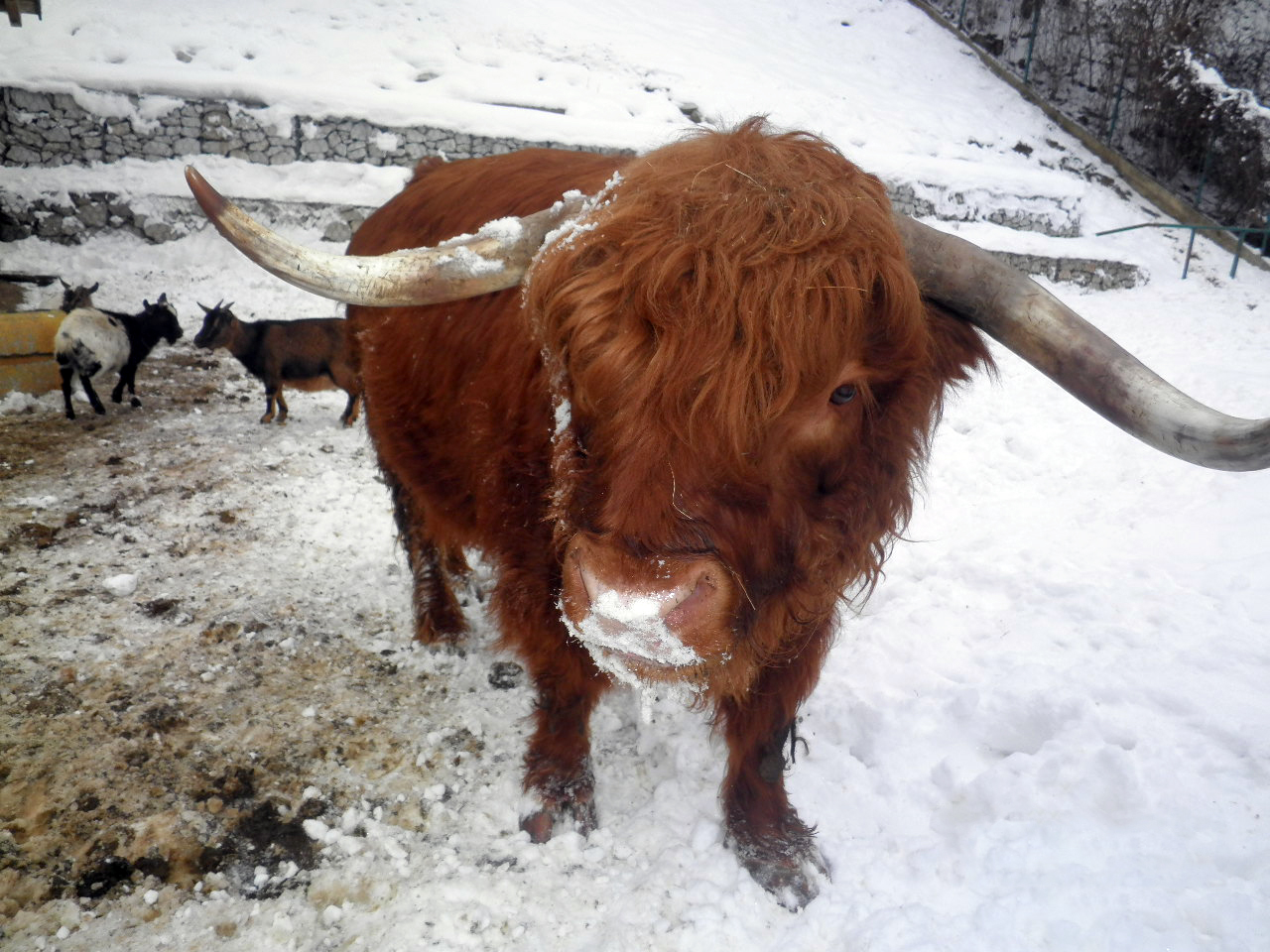
Highland cattle

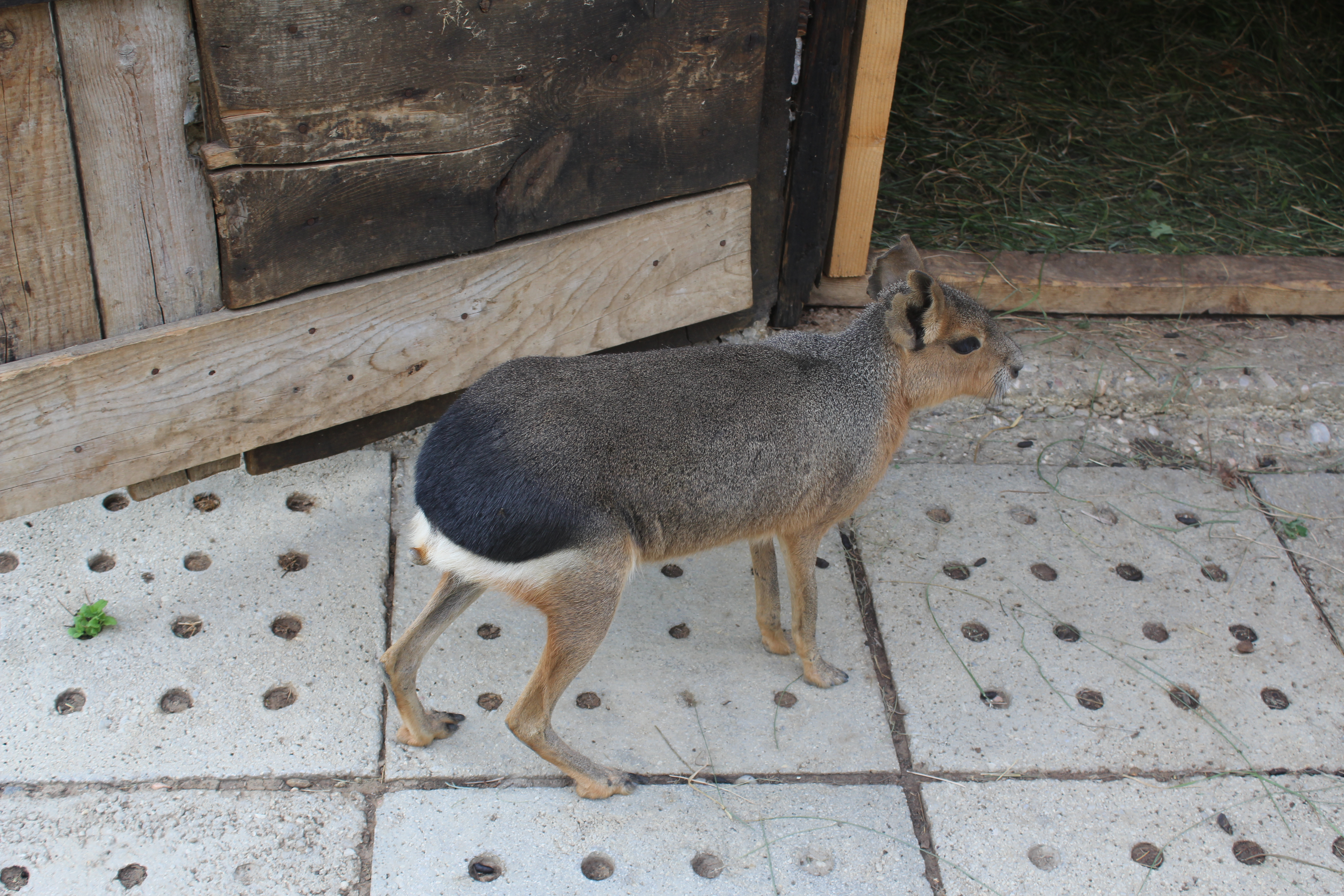
Patagonian mara

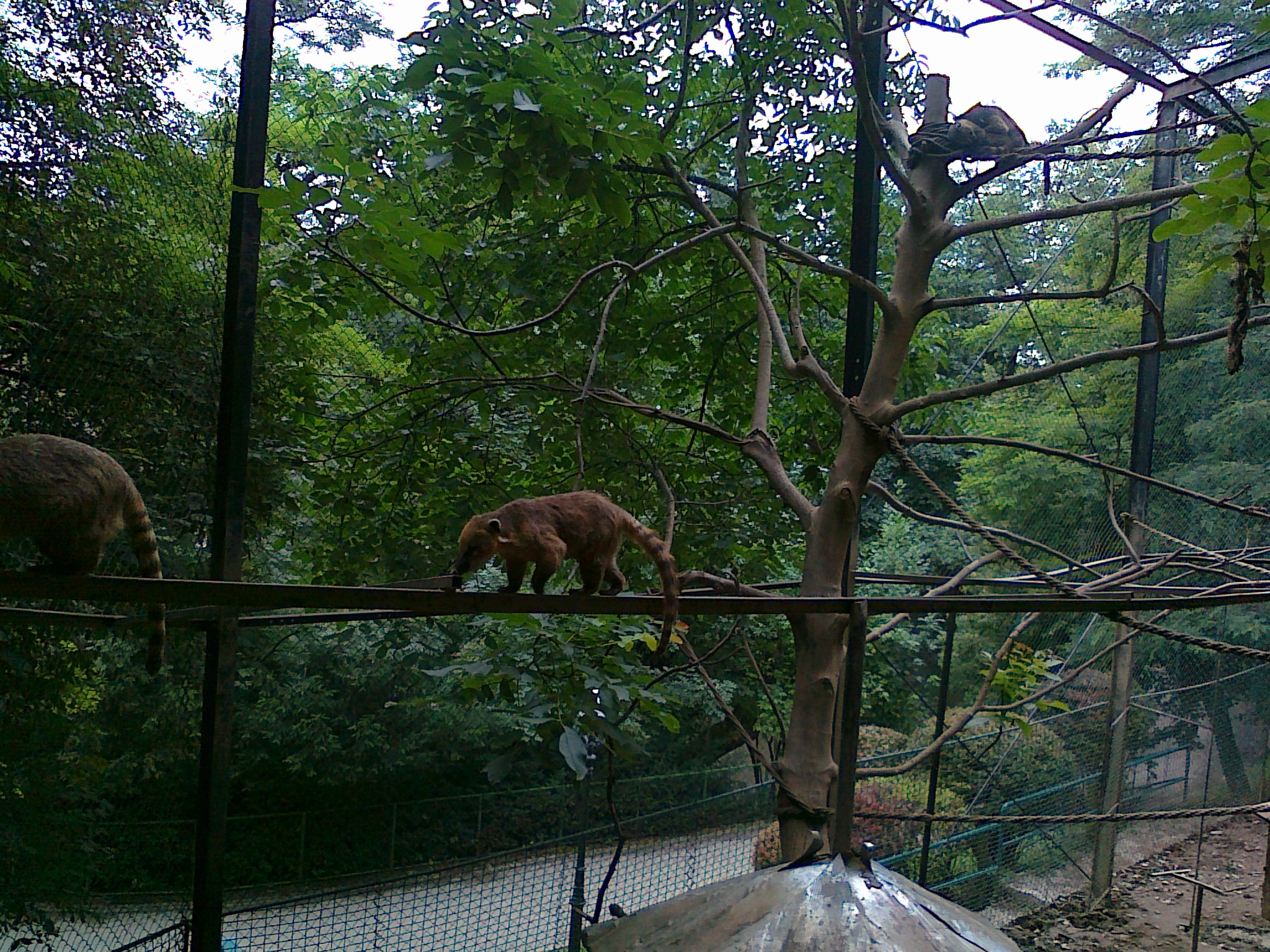
South American coati

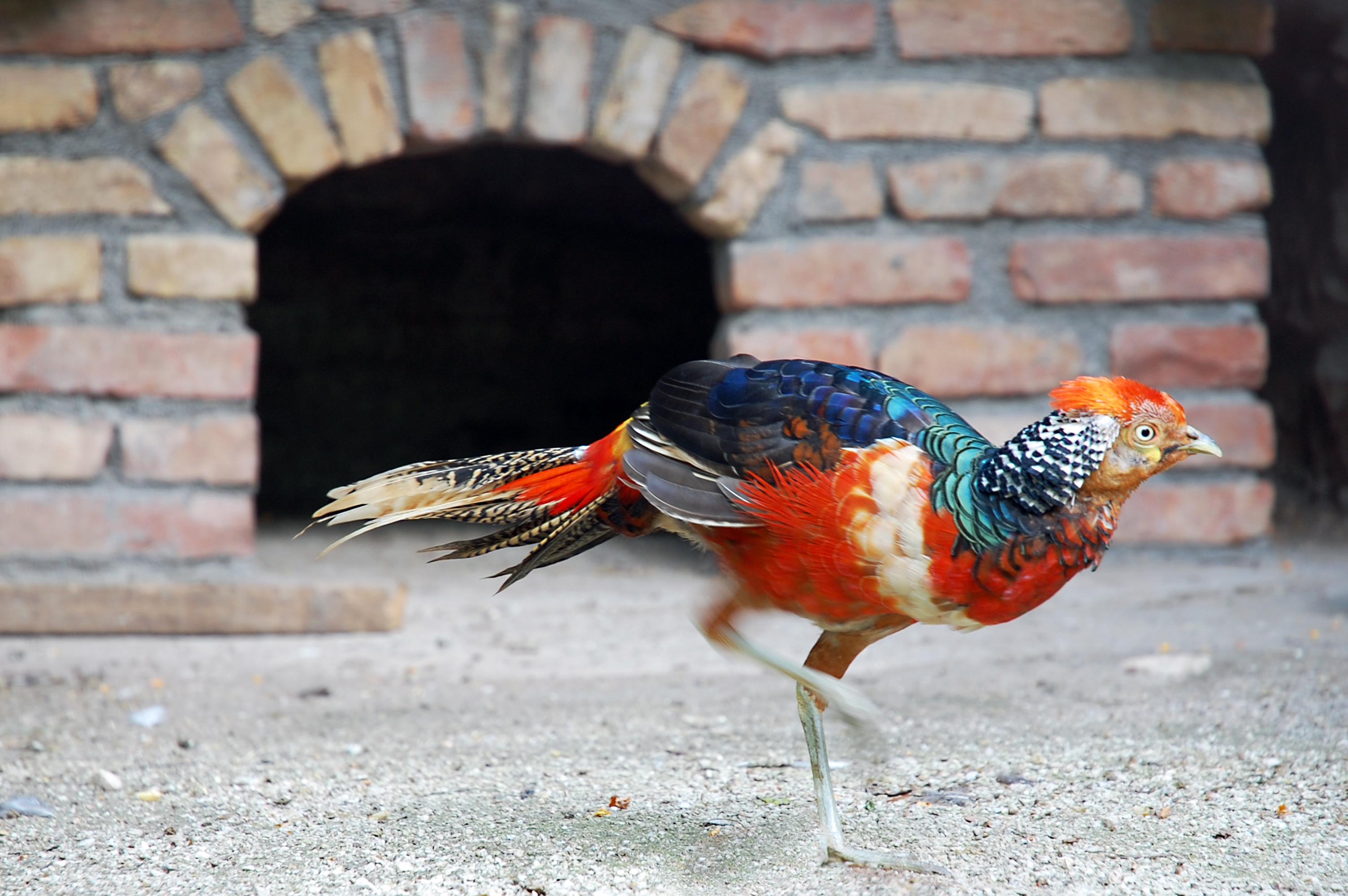
Common pheasant

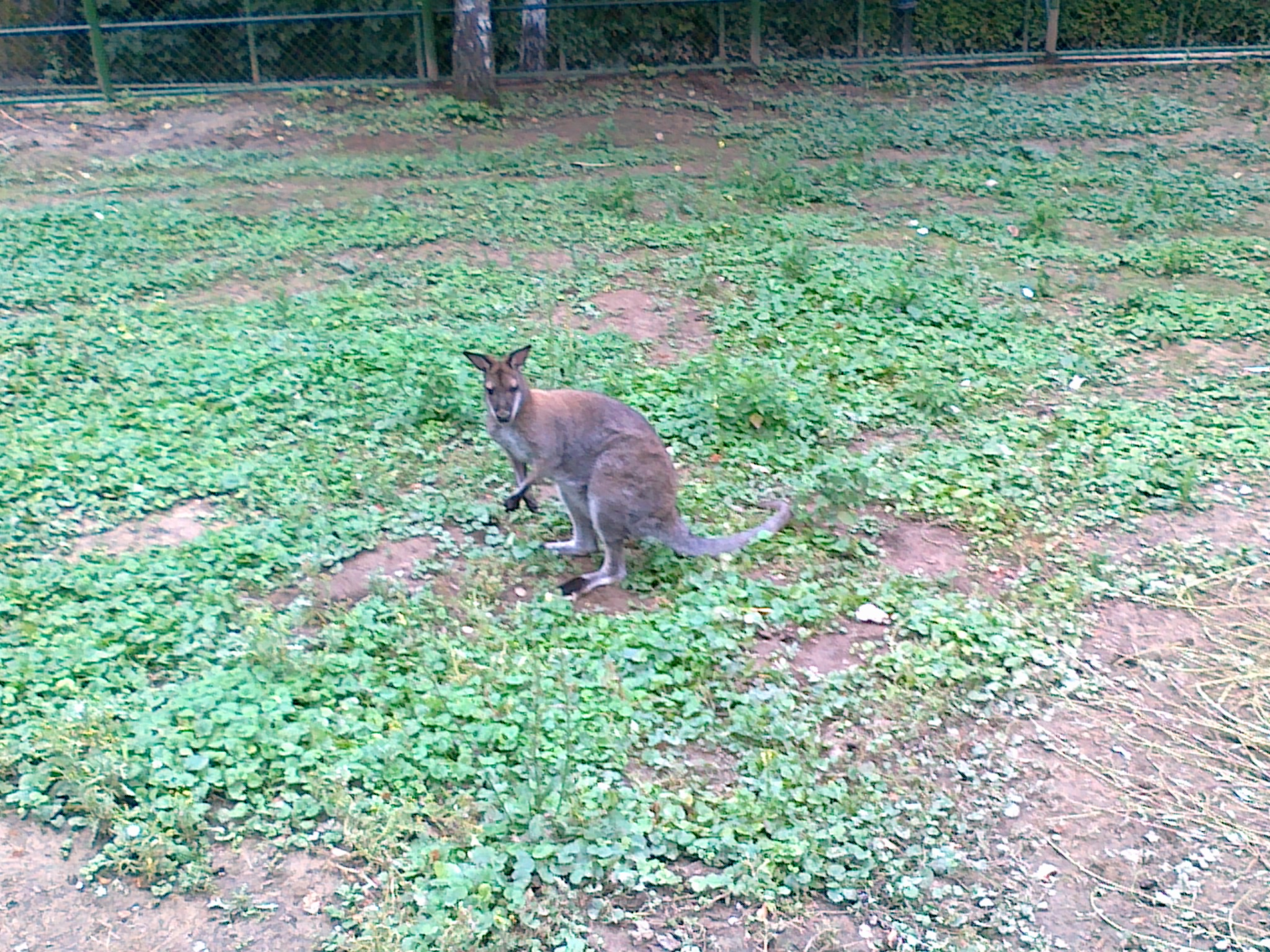
Tammar wallaby

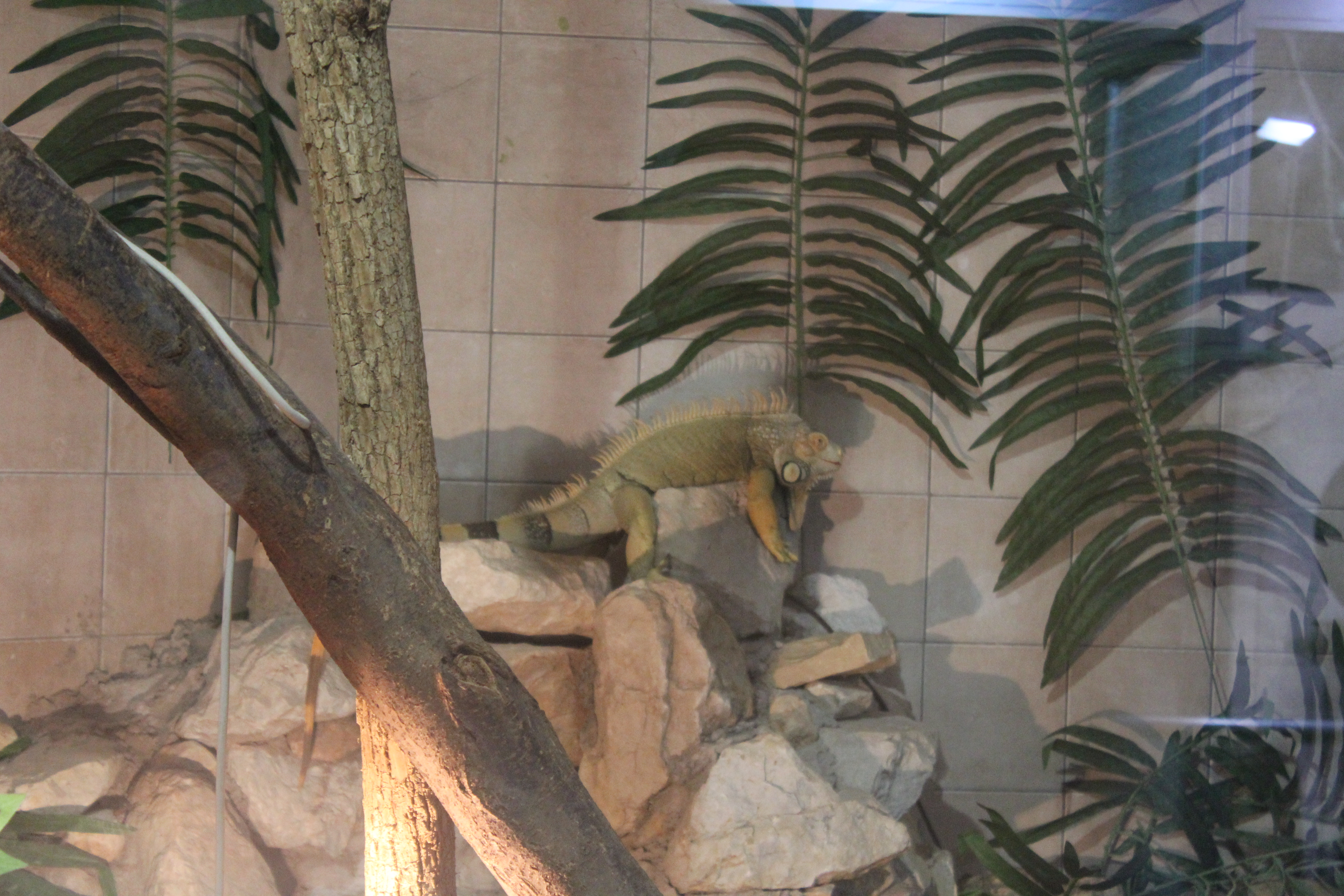
Green iguana

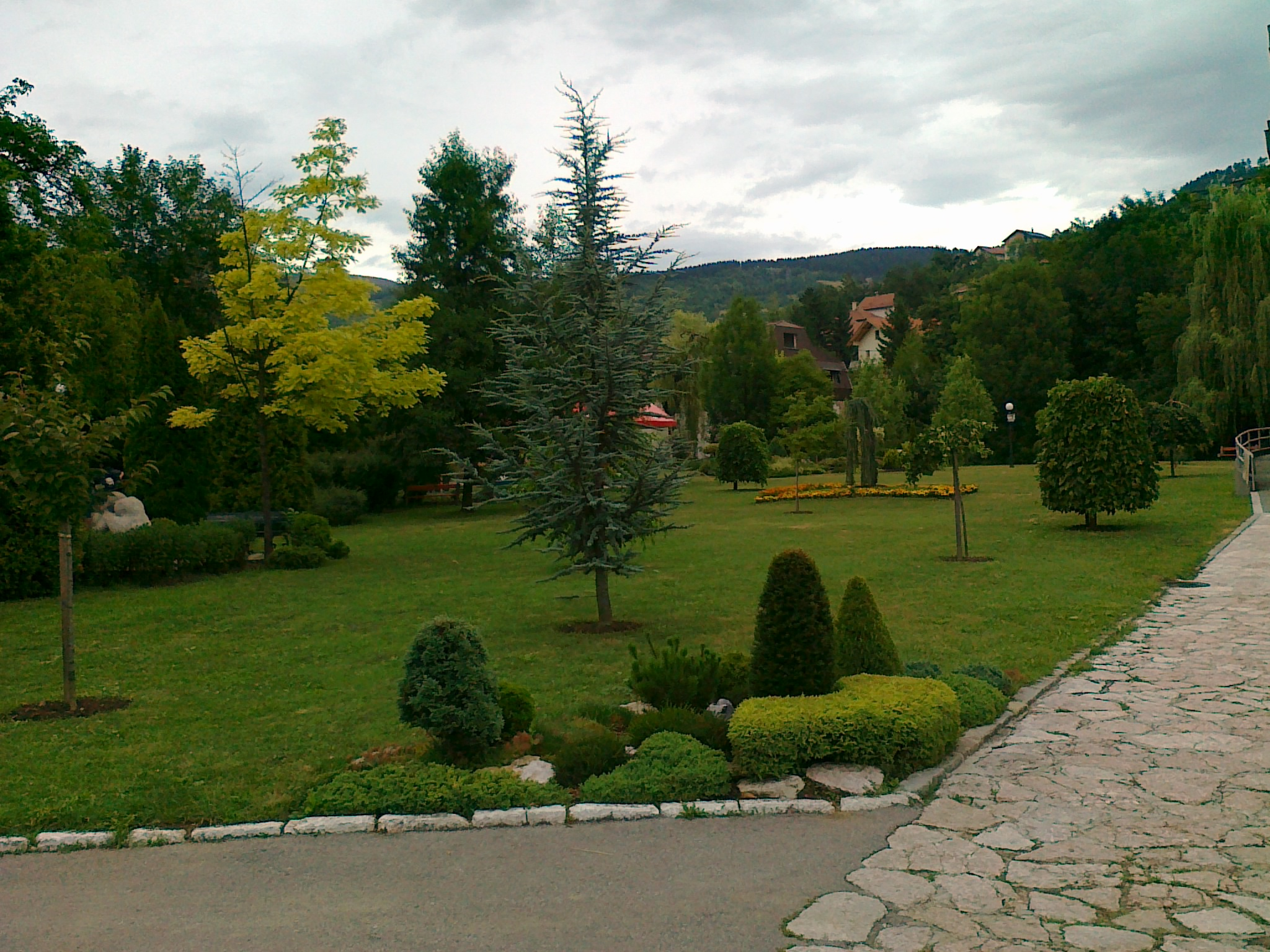
Landscape in the park
