= Koševo =

Koševo Кошево
- Neighborhood
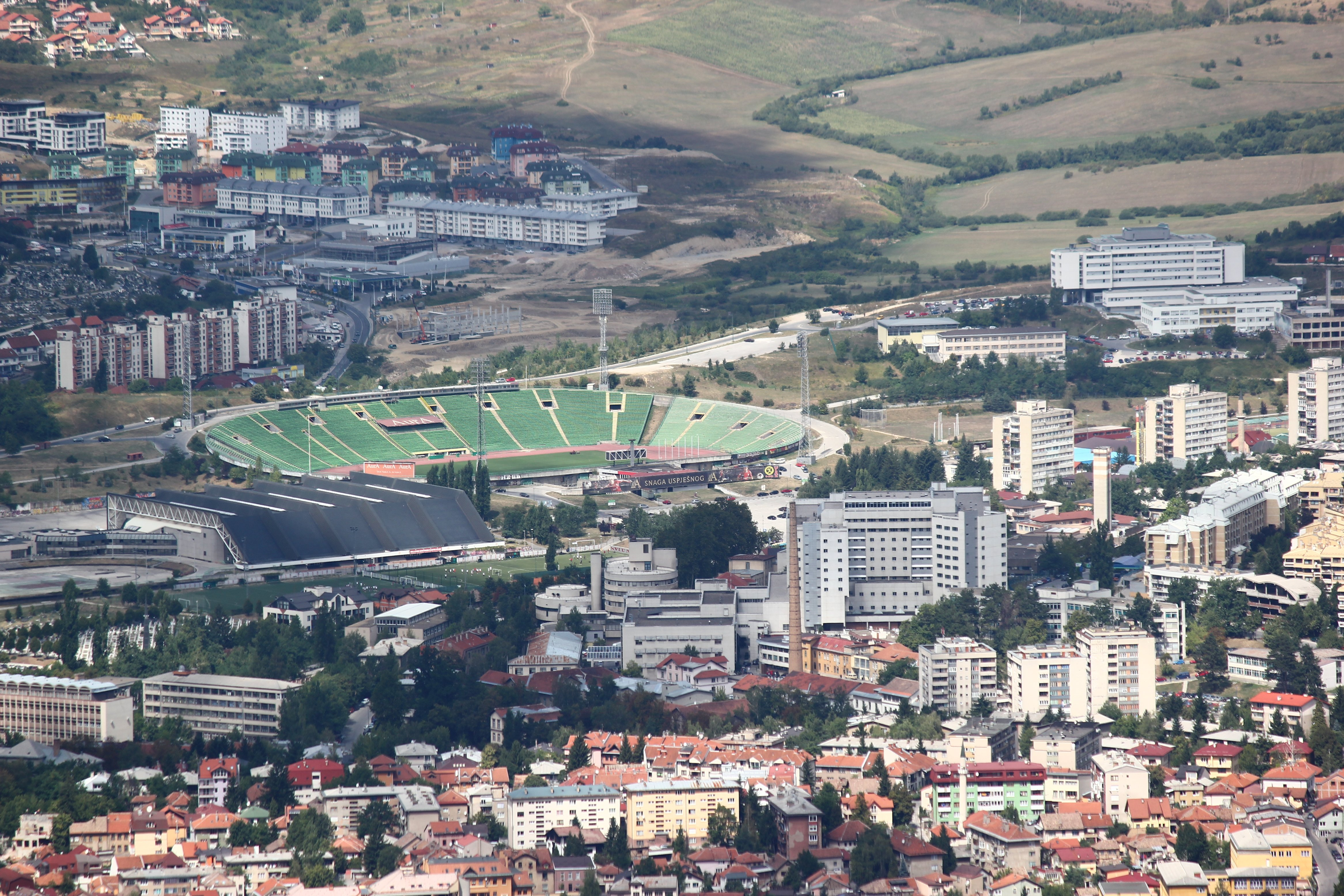
- Interactive map of Koševo
- Coordinates: 43°52′20.8″N 18°24′43.4″E
- Country: Bosnia and Herzegovina
- Time zone: UTC+1 (CET)
  - Summer (DST): UTC+2 (CEST)
- Area code: +387 33

Koševo (Cyrillic: Кошево) is a neighborhood in the municipality of Centar in central Sarajevo in Bosnia and Herzegovina. It is split between the local communities of Džidžikovac-Koševo I and Koševo II. It is located between the older parts of the city under Stari Grad and the newer more modern parts of the city under the municipality of Novo Sarajevo.

The Koševo City Stadium and Zetra Olympic Hall, at which the opening and closing ceremonies of the 1984 Winter Olympics were held, are part of a huge sport complex, which includes the Faculty of Sport and Physical Culture and the university's swimming pool as well, located in Koševo. Also, the city's zoo-park Pionirska dolina (Pioneer's Valley), Groblje Lav (Lion Cemetery) and the city's maternity and children's hospital are located within the boundaries of the neighborhood. Famous people from Koševo include Nenad Janković and Davor Sučić, members of the rock band Zabranjeno Pušenje. Koševo is home to 10,809 residents.

== Sources ==
- Karajlić, Nele (2014). Fajront u Sarajevu. Belgrade: Laguna / Novosti. ISBN 9788652115648.
