= Sarajevo Canton Building =

Government building in Sarajevo, Bosnia and Herzegovina

- Zgrada Kantona Sarajevo
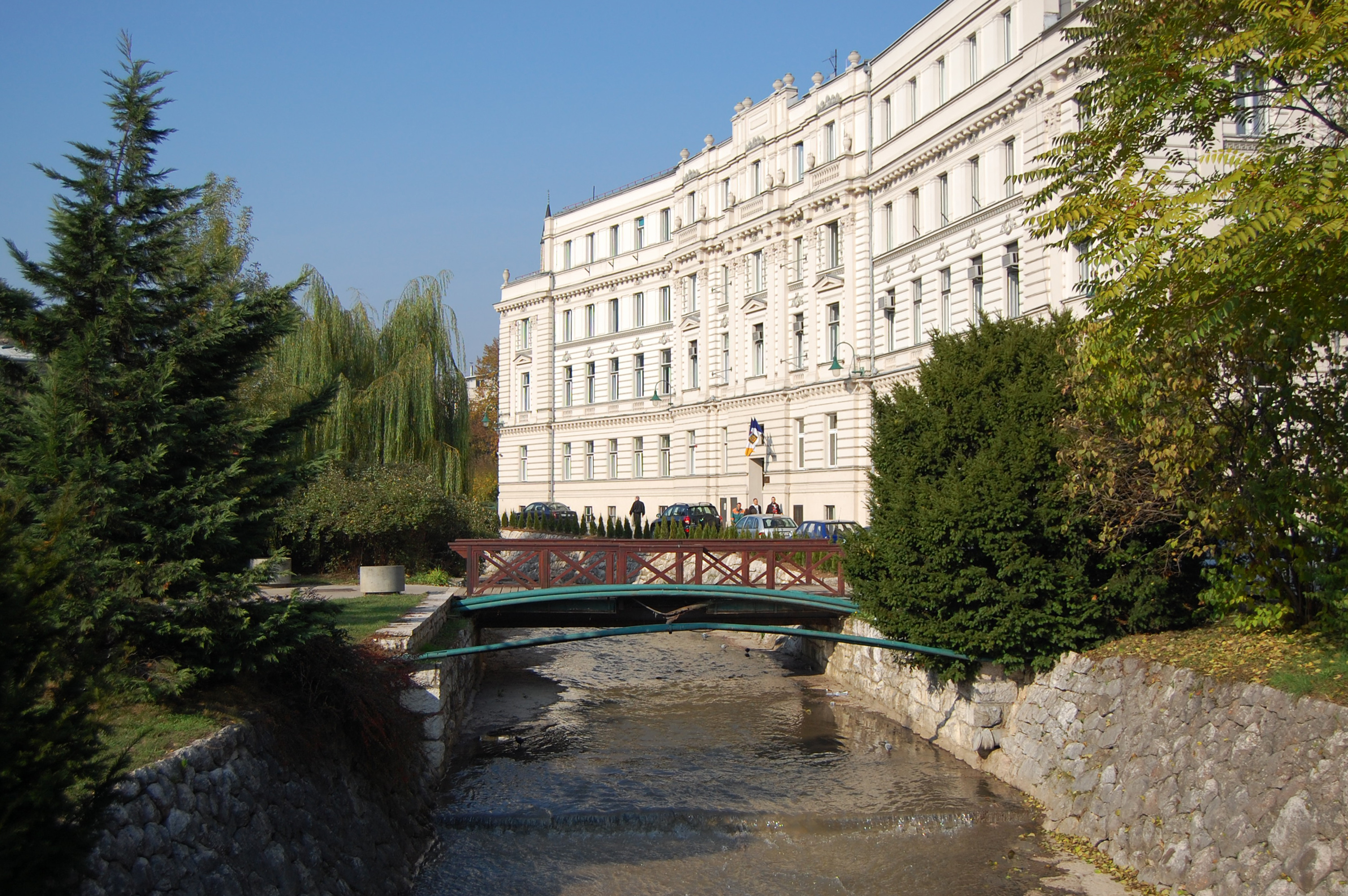
- The Sarajevo Canton Building in 2011
- Interactive map of the Sarajevo Canton Building area

General information
- Type: Government building
- Location: Sarajevo, Bosnia and Herzegovina, Reisa Džemaludina Čauševića 1, Sarajevo 71000, Bosna i Hercegovina
- Coordinates: 43°51′26.42″N 18°24′48.48″E
- Completed: 1907
- Owner: Sarajevo Canton

Technical details
- Floor count: 3

Design and construction
- Architect: Karel Pařík

The Sarajevo Canton Building (Bosnian: Zgrada Kantona Sarajevo), also referred to as the Centar Municipality Building (Bosnian: Zgrada Općine Centar), is a government building in Sarajevo, Bosnia and Herzegovina. It currently houses the Sarajevo Canton government, as well as the Sarajevo Canton Assembly. It is also the seat of the Centar Municipality, one of four municipalities of the city of Sarajevo. The Commission to Preserve National Monuments declared the building a national monument of Bosnia and Herzegovina in April 2018.

== Location ==
The building is located in the immediate vicinity of the Building of the Presidency of Bosnia and Herzegovina. To the west of the building is Koševski Potok and Hamze Hume Street, and to the east is Džemaludina Čauševića Street.

== History ==
In Sarajevo, after the Austro-Hungarian occupation in 1878, the first administrative buildings were built as monumental buildings in Neo-Renaissance style. Forms of the developed and late Renaissance were applied in a variety of shapes and more complex compositions.

Due to the increase in the volume of work and thus the increase in the number of employees of the central authorities, the Austro-Hungarian administration in Sarajevo had to build a new building ten years after the construction of the first government building.

The construction of this building began on 30 January 1906, and was completed in April 1907. The project of the building's construction was designed by prominent Czech architect Karel Pařík.

After World War II, the building housed the Sarajevo City Assembly and the mayor's office. The Centar Municipality administration was also located in the same building. During that period, reconstruction of the amphitheatre and reception hall was carried out.

During the 2014 unrest in Bosnia and Herzegovina, the building was torched and stoned by demonstrators. On 26 April 2018, the Commission to Preserve National Monuments declared the building a national monument of Bosnia and Herzegovina.

== Description ==
The building's facade is designed in the spirit of Renaissance and Classicism. The breakdown of the facade is horizontal with prominent cornices, with consoles, above the ground floor and above the second and third floors, which highlights the part of the facade with decorative plastic in the form of garlands and wreaths. The additional articulation of the facade is emphasized by fore-bodies, different on each facade, as well as superimposed fore-bodies. The facade decoration is also complemented by decorative vases and obelisks on the final floor of the building.
