= Centar, Sarajevo =

Municipality in Bosnia and Herzegovina

Centar Центар Center
- Municipality
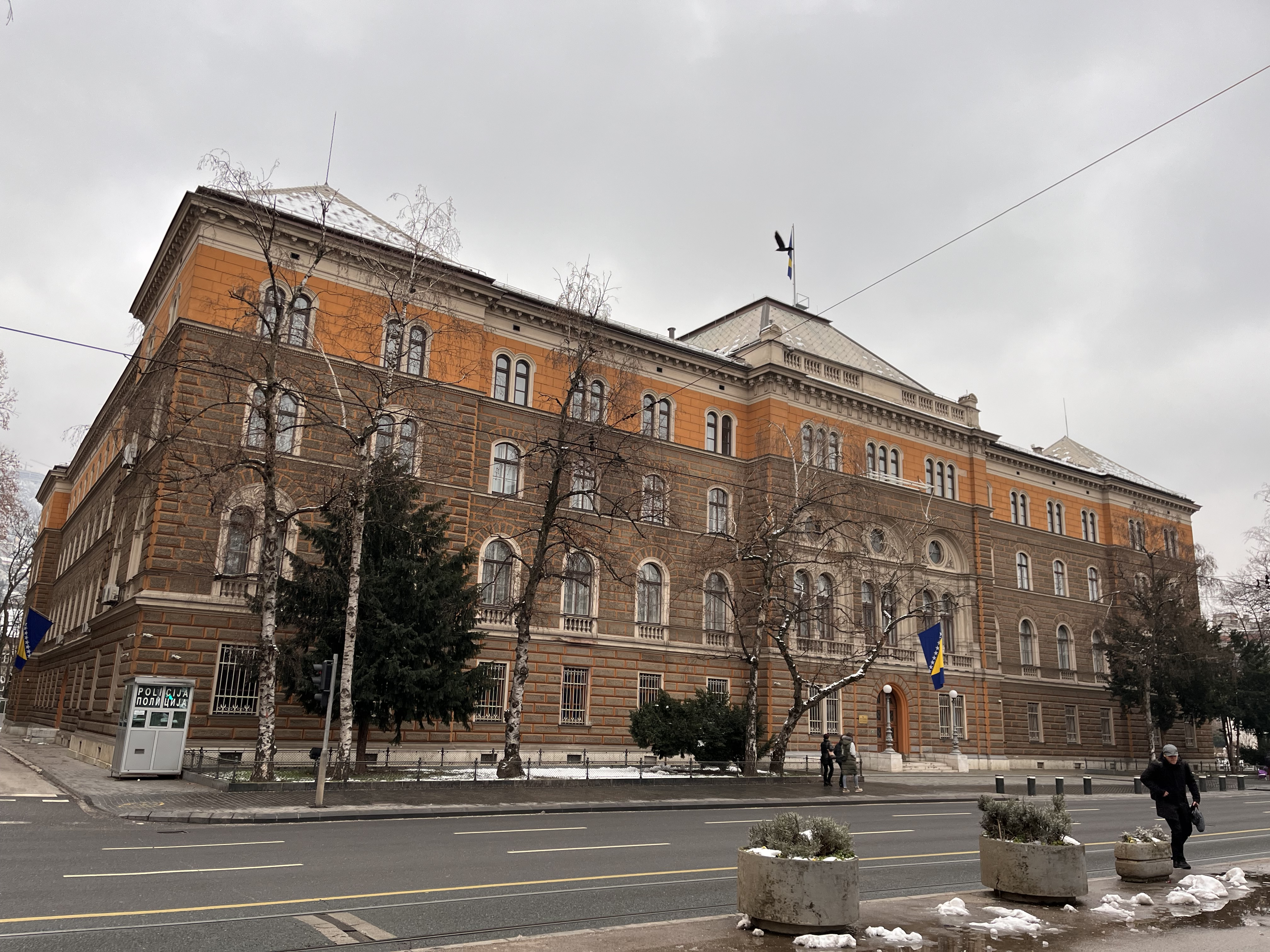
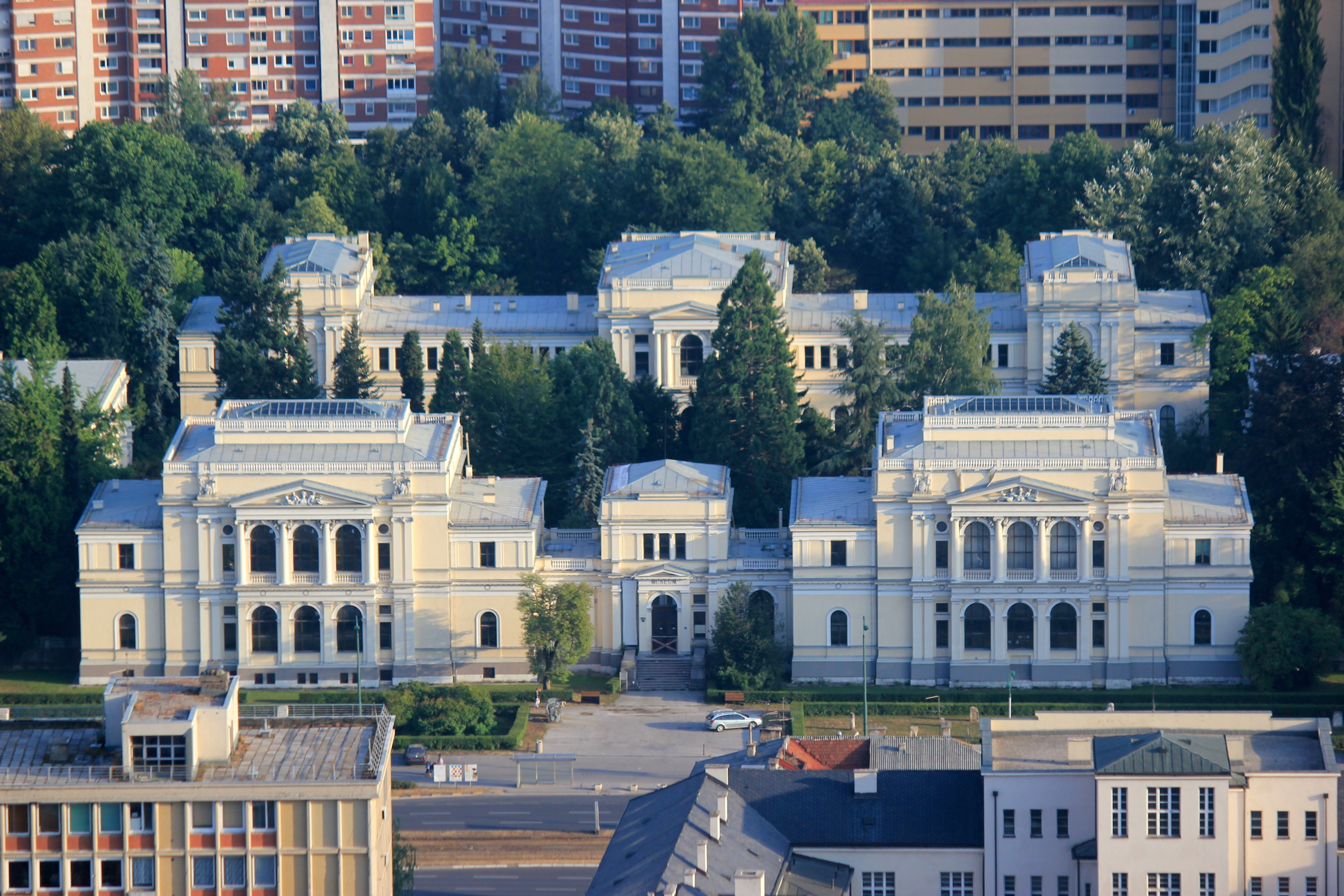
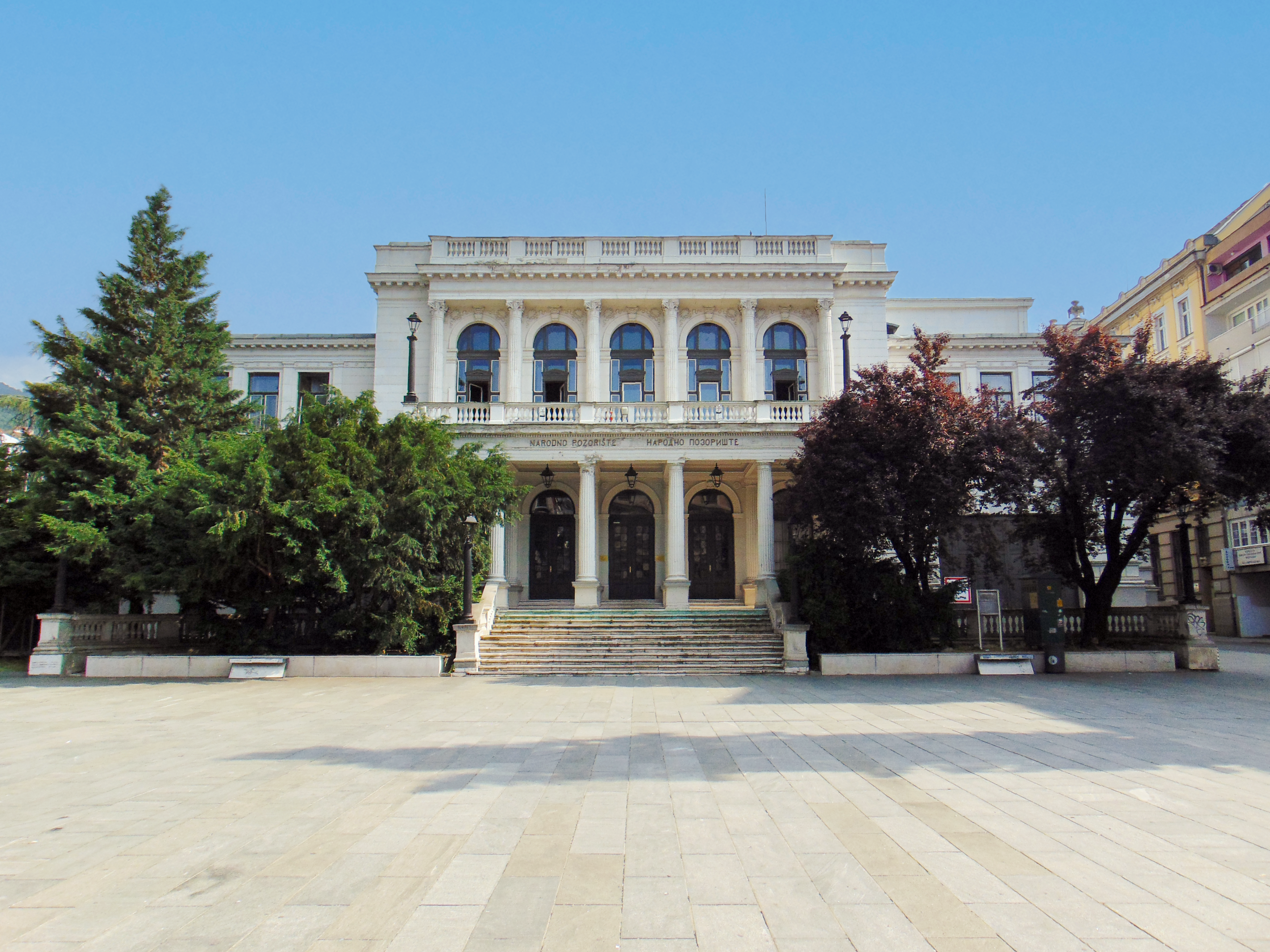
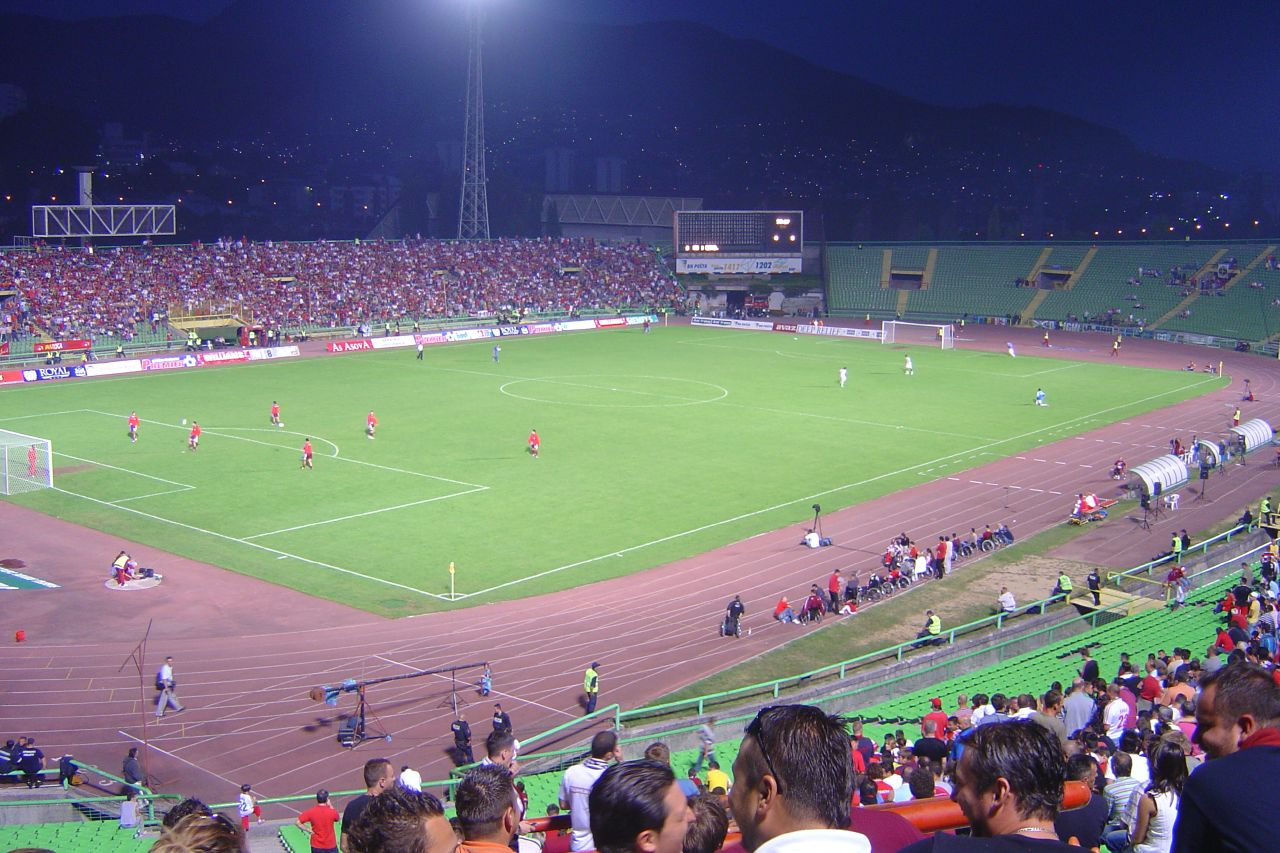
- Presidency Building National Museum Sarajevo National Theatre Skenderija Koševo City Stadium

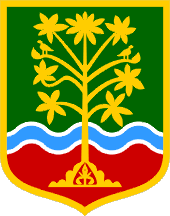
- Seal

- Location of Centar Municipality, Sarajevo within Bosnia and Herzegovina.
- Coordinates: 43°52′8″N 18°24′31″E
- Country: Bosnia and Herzegovina
- Entity: Federation of Bosnia and Herzegovina
- Canton: Sarajevo Canton
- City: Sarajevo
- Status: Urban

Government
  - Municipal mayor: Srđan Mandić (NS)

Area
  - Total: 33 km^{2} (13 sq mi)

Population (2013 census)
  - Total: 55,181
  - Density: 1,795/km^{2} (4,650/sq mi)
- Time zone: UTC+1 (CET)
  - Summer (DST): UTC+2 (CEST)
- Area code: +387 33
- Website: www.centar.ba

Centar (Cyrillic: Центар, lit. ”Center") is a municipality of the city of Sarajevo, Bosnia and Herzegovina. It is located between the older parts of the city under Stari Grad, and the newer more modern parts of the city under the municipalities Novi Grad and Novo Sarajevo.

The Centar municipality is the administrative, business, commercial, cultural, educational, and medical centre of Sarajevo. Although some of these may be disputed, Centar is certainly the most important part of Sarajevo, housing most major branches of the city and national governments.

The municipality of Centar occupies 3,313 hectrates of land, of which close to 17% is housing. The amount of private and state owned land is nearly equal, with 1600 and 1713 hectrates respectively. The municipality celebrates May 2 as "Centar Municipality Day", in commemoration of the heroic defense by citizens of the aggressor's assault on the Building of the Presidency of Bosnia and Herzegovina. Centar is also home to many Olympic complexes such as Mirza Delibašić Hall and sports venues Asim Ferhatović Hase Stadium and Zetra Olympic Hall.

== History ==
The Siege of Sarajevo had a tremendous effect on Centar. Prior to the aggression, Centar municipality had 79,000 citizens, of which the majority were Bosniaks. 7,000 citizens of the municipality were killed by the aggressors during the war, as major battles took place on its grounds. There was also a heavy presence of land mines in the area, however in December 2003 the government succeeded in clearing all land mines from the area. Since the end of the war, the municipality has received 12 major awards, indicating its current well-being and prosperity.

== Politics ==
The municipal mayor of Centar is Srđan Mandić from Our Party.

The municipal council has 31 seats in total, which are allocated as follows:

1. Our Party - 7 seats
2. Social Democratic Party - 7 seats
3. Party of Democratic Action - 6 seats
4. People and Justice - 4 seats
5. Party for Bosnia and Herzegovina - 4 seats
6. Democratic Front - 2 seats
7. People's European Union - 1 seat

== Demographics ==
Ethnic makeup of Centar (Note: Percentages for 1971 and 1981 were rounded to two decimal points.)
	1971	1981	1991	2013
Albanians	749 (0.59%)	143 (0.2%)	-	-
Bosniaks (Note: Prior to 2013, Bosniaks were counted under the name "Muslims".)	74,354 (58.73%)	31,755 (43.64%%)	36,761 (50.1%)	41,702 (75.6%)
Croats	12,903 (10.19%)	6,624 (9.1%)	5,428 (6.8%)	3,333 (6%)
Hungarians	137 (0.11%)	55 (0.08%)	-	-
Macedonians	186 (0.15%)	97 (0.13%)	-	-
Montenegrins	1,687 (1.33%)	999 (1.37%)	-	-
Roma	22 (0.02%)	278 (0.38%)	-	-
Serbs	27,658 (21.85%)	14,358 (19.73%)	16,631 (21%)	2,186 (4%)
Slovenes	565 (0.45%)	230 (0.32%)	-	-
Yugoslavs	5944 (2.3%)	17,170 (23.6%)	-	-
Others	-	-	17,466 (22%)	7,960 (14.4%)
Total	126,598	72,762	79,286	55,181

== Local communities ==
Centar consists of the following 19 local communities:

1. Bardakčije
2. Betanija
3. Breka
4. Ciglane
5. Crni Vrh-Gorica
6. Donji Velešići
7. Džidžikovac-Koševo I
8. Hrastovi-Mrkovići
9. Koševo II
10. Koševsko Brdo
11. Marijin Dvor
12. Mejtaš-Bjelave
13. Nahorevo
14. Park-Višnjik
15. Pionirska Dolina
16. Skenderija-Podtekija
17. Soukbunar
18. Šip
19. Trg Oslobođenja-Centar

== Gallery ==
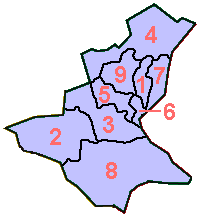
No. 1 on this map of the Sarajevo Canton

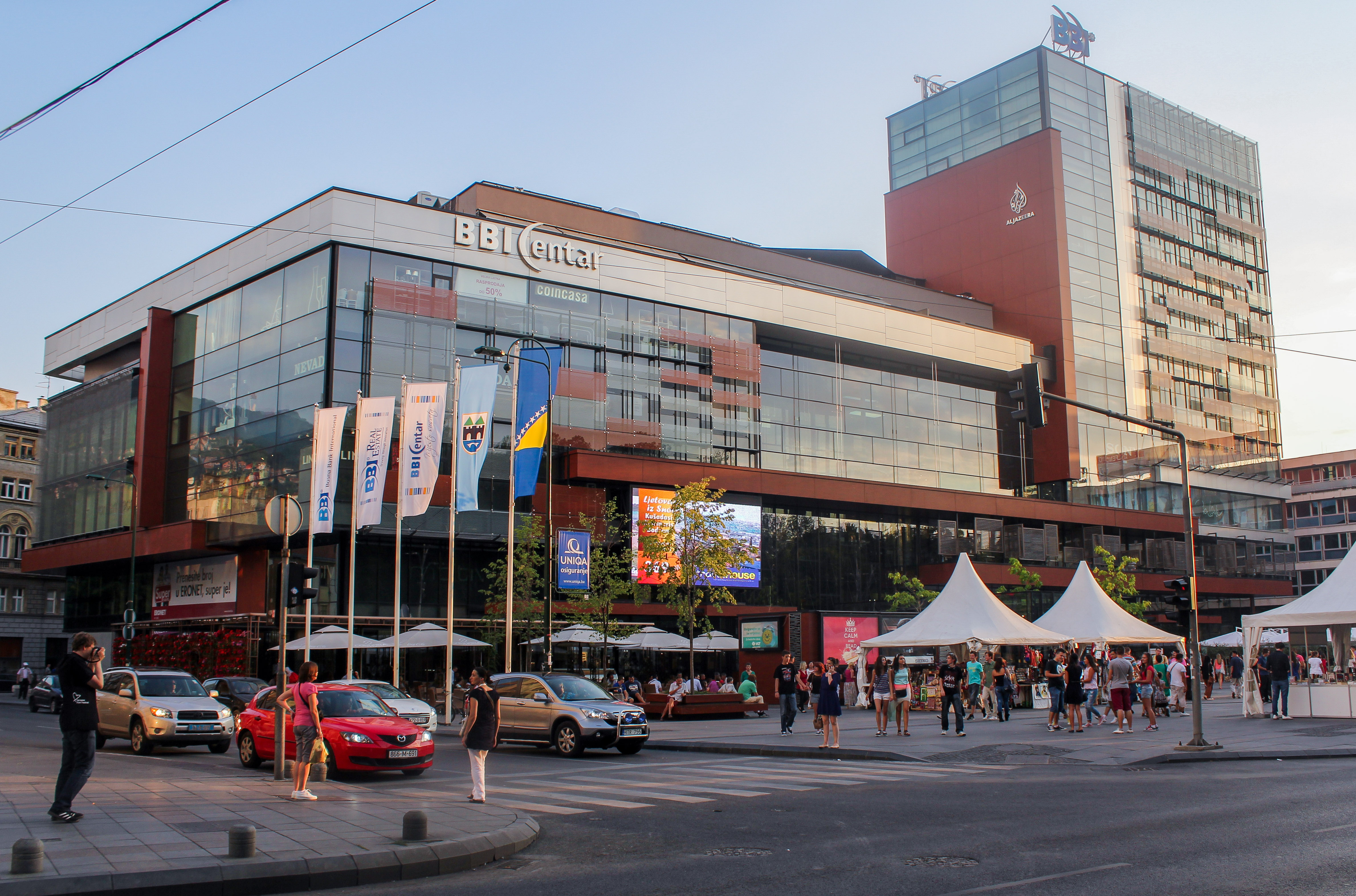
ARIA Centar

Avaz Twist Tower

Greece–Bosnia and Herzegovina Friendship Building

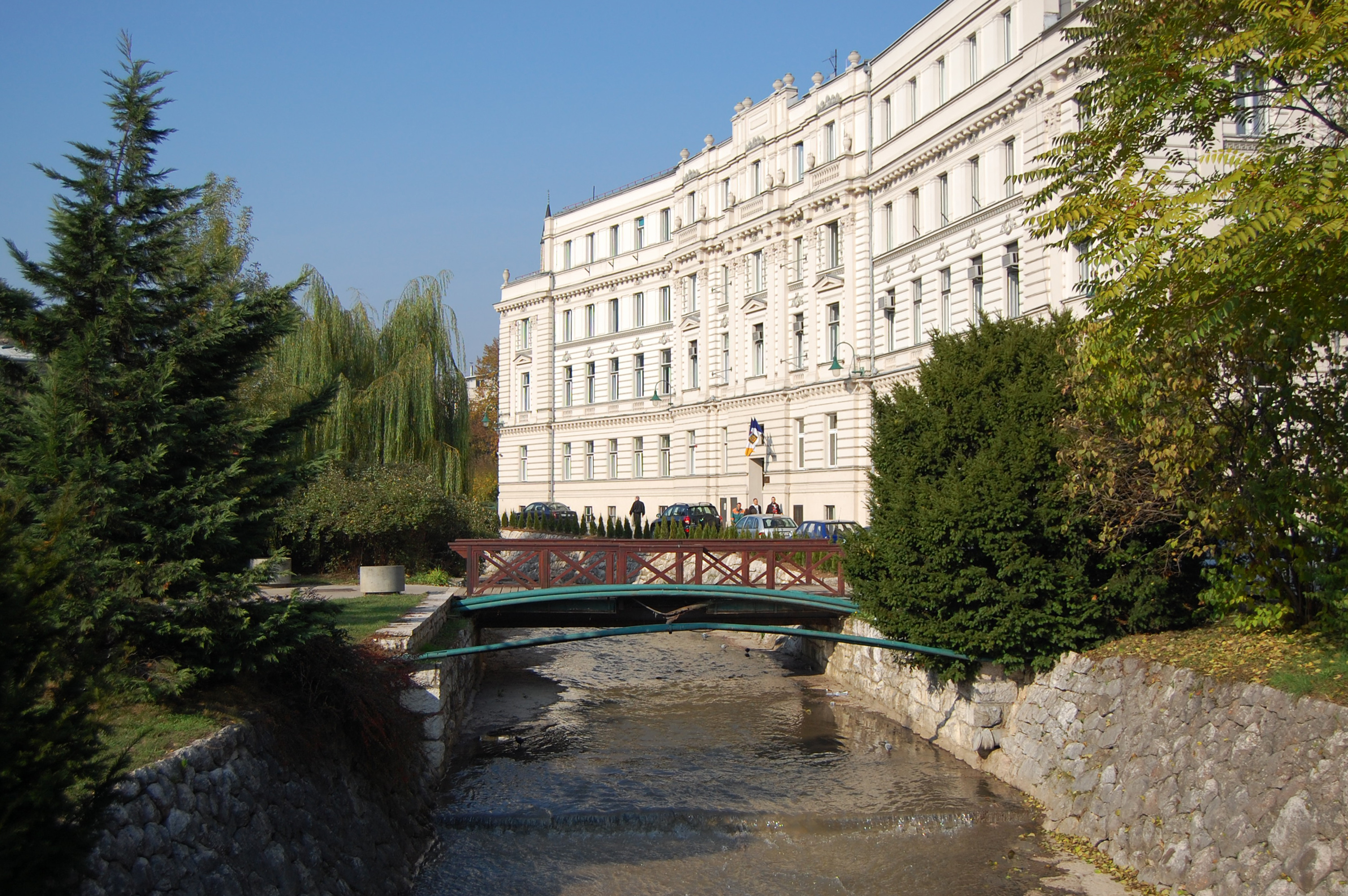
Sarajevo Canton Building

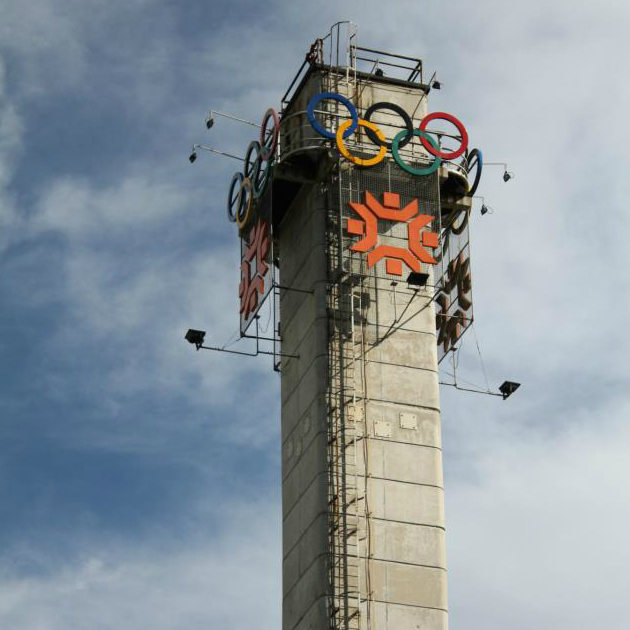
Olympic tower of the 1984 Winter Olympics

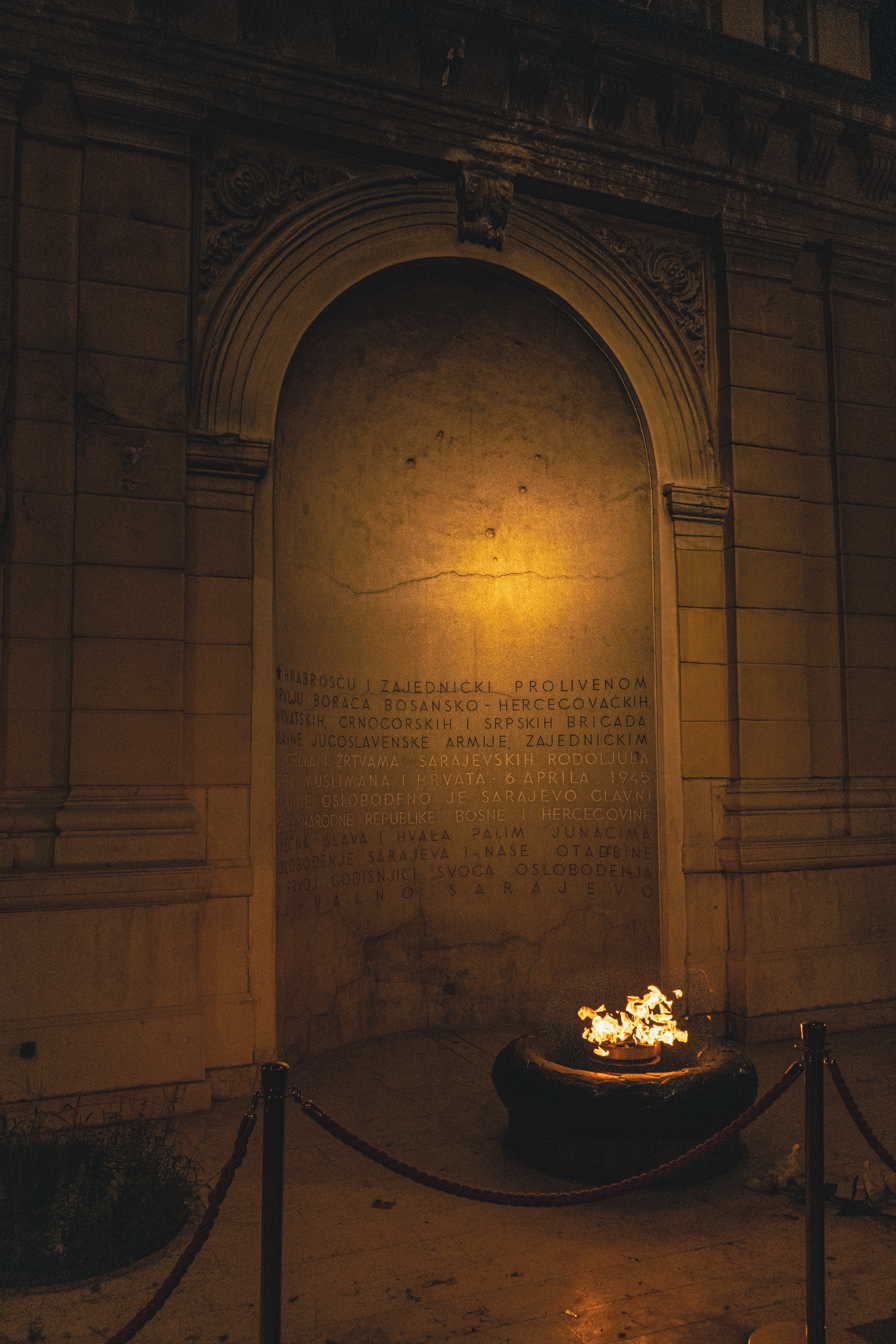
Eternal flame

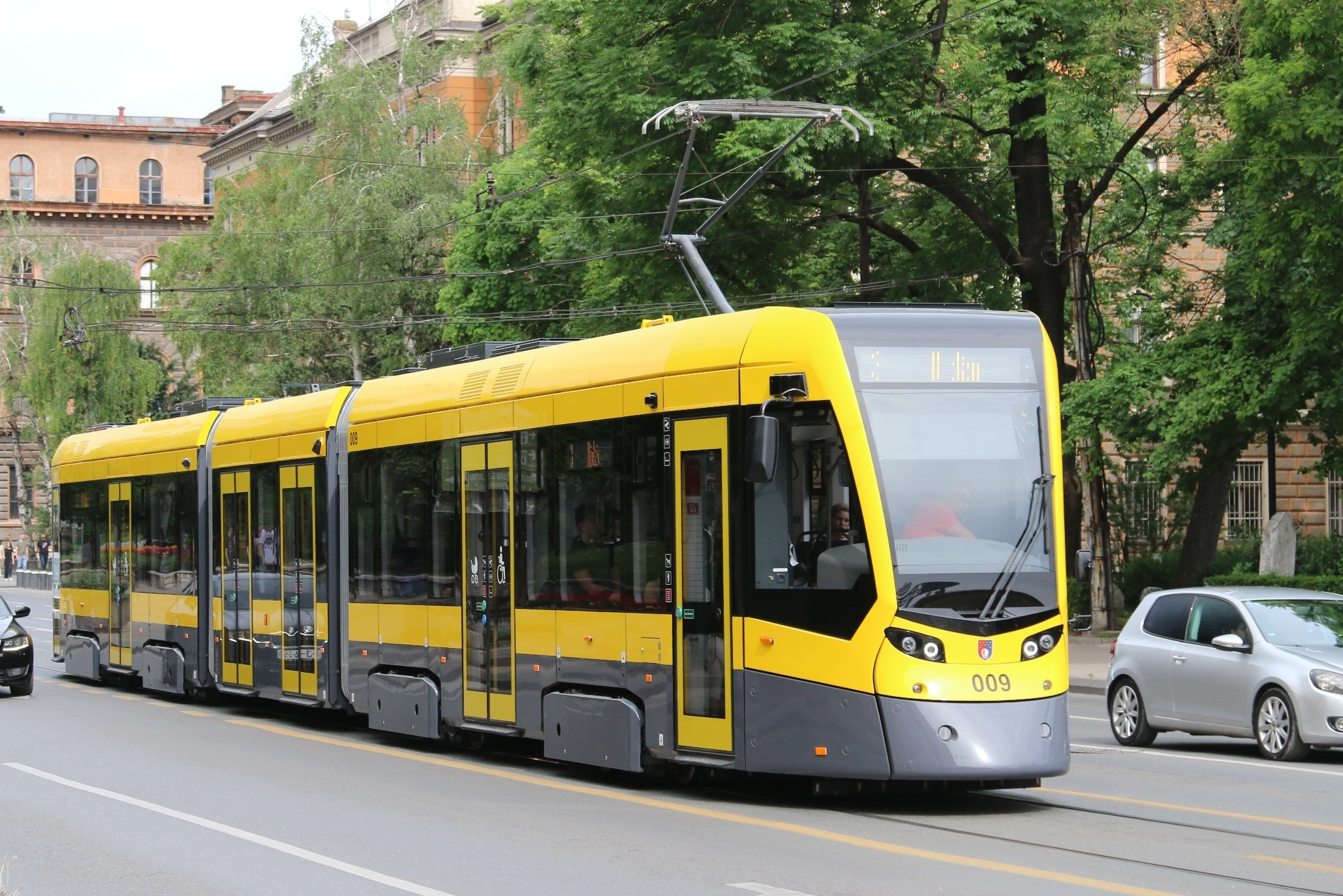
Sarajevo tram
