= Hotel Central (Sarajevo) =

Hotel in Sarajevo, Bosnia and Herzegovina

- Hotel Central in 2025
- Interactive map of the Hotel Central area

General information
- Location: Stari Grad, Sarajevo, Bosnia and Herzegovina, 8 Ćumurija Street; Sarajevo, 71000, Bosnia and Herzegovina
- Coordinates: 43°51′29″N 18°25′34″E
- Opening: 6 May 1889
- Owner: Templeville Developments Ltd.
- Management: Templeville Developments Limited BH d.o.o.

Design and construction
- Architects: Josip Vancaš (1882); Sead Gološ (2008 renovation)

Other information
- Number of rooms: 32
- Number of suites: 8

Website
- https://www.hotelcentral.ba

Hotel Central is a historic hotel located in Sarajevo, the capital city of Bosnia and Herzegovina. It stands at the corner of Zelenih Beretki and Ćumurija streets. It was built in the 1880s, as part of the development of the Bosnian capital during Austro-Hungarian rule. The building was designed by Croatian architect Josip Vancaš.

The hotel is owned and managed by the Irish company Templeville Developments Ltd. and includes the Westwood Club & Spa within its facilities.

== History ==
The name Central was chosen because, at the time, Franz Joseph Street - today known as Zelenih beretki - served as the city’s main promenade. The hotel was completed in 1889 based on a design by Josip Vancaš and was financed by the city’s waqf (Islamic endowment). The building has three floors. Given its location on one of the most prominent sites in the city center, the Waqf Commission decided to lease out the entire building under the condition that a café would be established on the ground floor.

The site where the hotel now stands was originally occupied by the Ajas Pasha Mosque, which was destroyed in 1697 when Eugene of Savoy set fire to Sarajevo. Although the mosque was rebuilt shortly thereafter, it was once again destroyed in a major fire that broke out in the Latinluk district in 1879. Following this second destruction, the mosque was not rebuilt. Instead, the waqf decided to finance the construction of a hotel on the same site, which became known as Ajas Pasha’s Court.

During the Bosnian War and the siege of Sarajevo in the 1990s, the hotel was largely destroyed and later completely reconstructed. During the restoration, only the outer walls were preserved, and the interior of the building was entirely rebuilt. The renovation of the façade aimed primarily to preserve the original architectural design of the decorative elements. The reconstruction was completed in 2008.

== Description ==
Unlike many other buildings constructed at that time in the emerging modern center of Sarajevo, buildings that referenced the architecture of Vienna and other cities of the monarchy, Vancaš drew inspiration from Oriental architecture, particularly Islamic design. For the two-story corner building, he designed windows in shapes typical of the Middle East with oriental motifs and horseshoe arches on the first floor. He emphasized the corner of the building with a first-floor balcony and a dome. The hotel was completed in 1889 and became the second hotel in the city, following Hotel Europe.
