= List of shopping malls in Sarajevo =

This is a list of historical, modern and projected shopping malls in Sarajevo, Bosnia and Herzegovina.

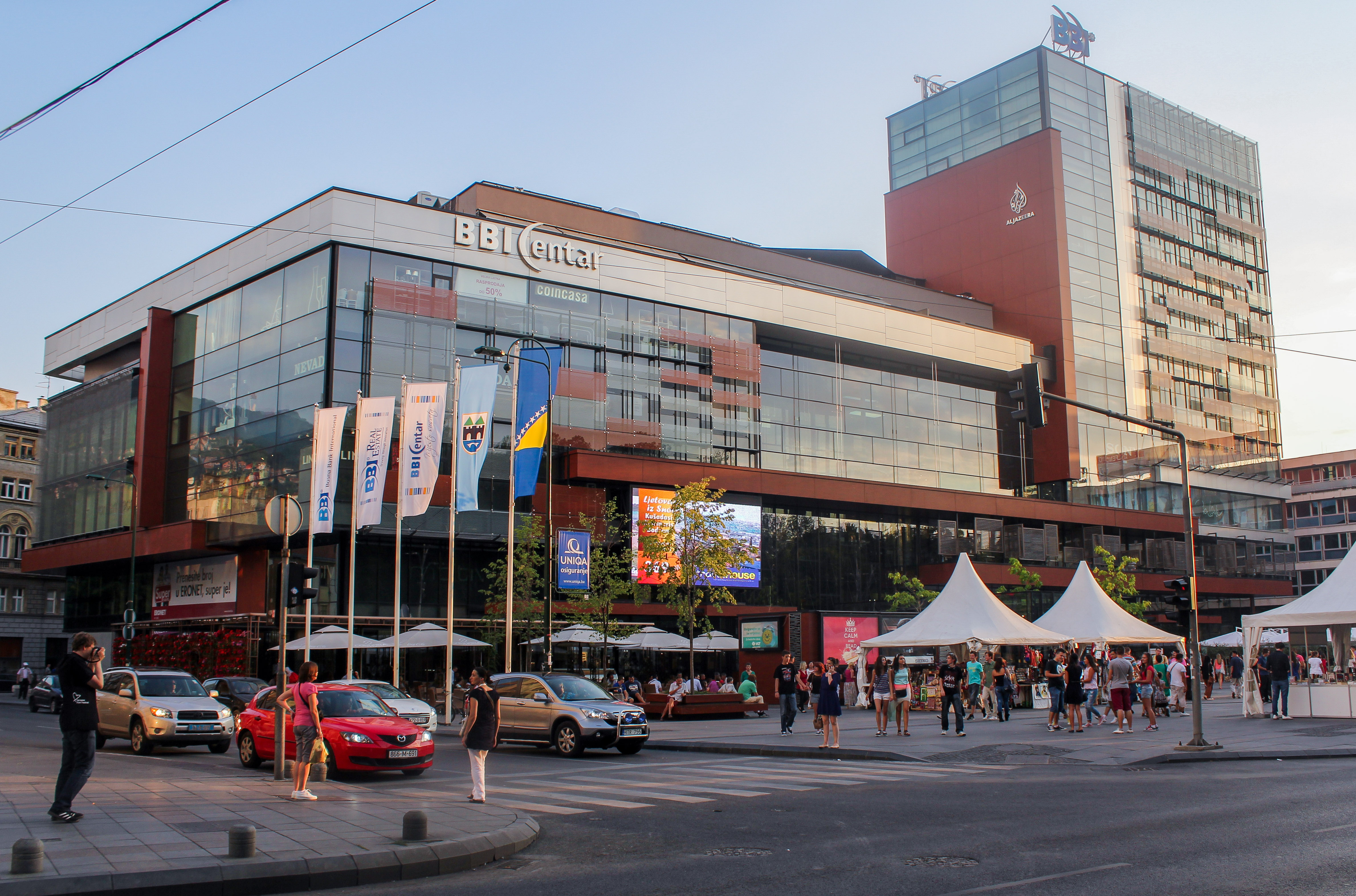
ARIA Center

Sarajevo City Center

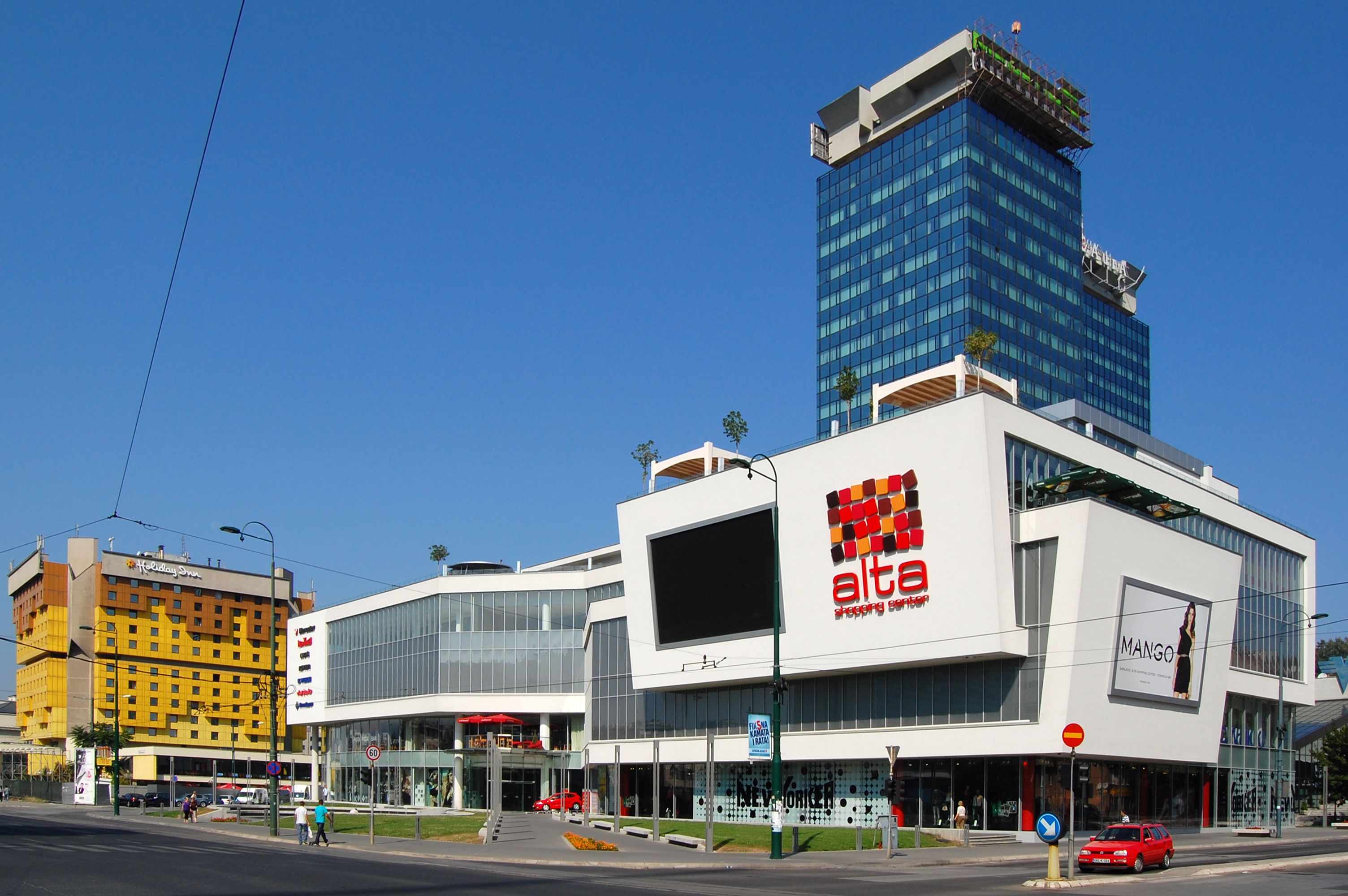
Alta Shopping Center

== Historical ==
- Bezistan (1551), Baščaršija

== Modern ==
- Sarajevo City Center (2014) 160 stores + 5 star hotel
- ARIA Center (2010) 125 stores | ICSC European Shopping Centre Awards winner 2011
- Alta Shopping Center (2011) 70 stores
- Bosmal City Center (2009) 50 stores (upon fulfilment)
- Importanne Center (2010) 35 stores
- Mercator Sarajevo (2000) 34 stores
- Grand Centar Ilidža (2007) 33 stores
- Mercator Dobrinja (2008) 20 stores

== Projected ==
- Airport Center Sarajevo (2013) 110 stores + multiplex cinema and airport connection
- Betanija City Center (2014) 90 stores + hotel

== See also ==
- Sarajevo
- Tourism in Bosnia and Herzegovina
