= Nova Breka =

Neighborhood in Sarajevo, Bosnia and Herzegovina

Nova Breka / New Breka is a neighborhood in the northwest part of Sarajevo, capital of Bosnia and Herzegovina.

Nova Breka is located in the hills of Sarajevo, with views of Sarajevo's downtown and skyscrapers: Unitic Center, Parliament Building, Avaz Tower, Sarajevo City Center, etc. Many notable film directors, screenwriters, professors, politicians, artists, managers, and entrepreneurs live in Nova Breka.

The Yugoslavian television show Memoari Porodice Milic was recorded at Nova Breka. In its legendary songs Zabranjeno Pusenje mention Breka several times. Moreover, Nova Breka is known for its restaurants and local coffee shops, such as Mama Mia, Lora, Rene, Verdi, Hill. In its surroundings, there are facilities for soccer, tennis and basketball (Complex Kosevo – Asim Ferhatovic) or sliding at Olympic Hall Juan Antonio Samaranch (formerly Zetra Olympic Hall)

There are also schools (Druga Gimnazija, for example), hospitals, a local market with organic and fresh vegetable and fruits, Faculty of Medicine, Faculty of Dentistry with Clinics, Faculty of Architecture, etc.
