= ARIA Centar =

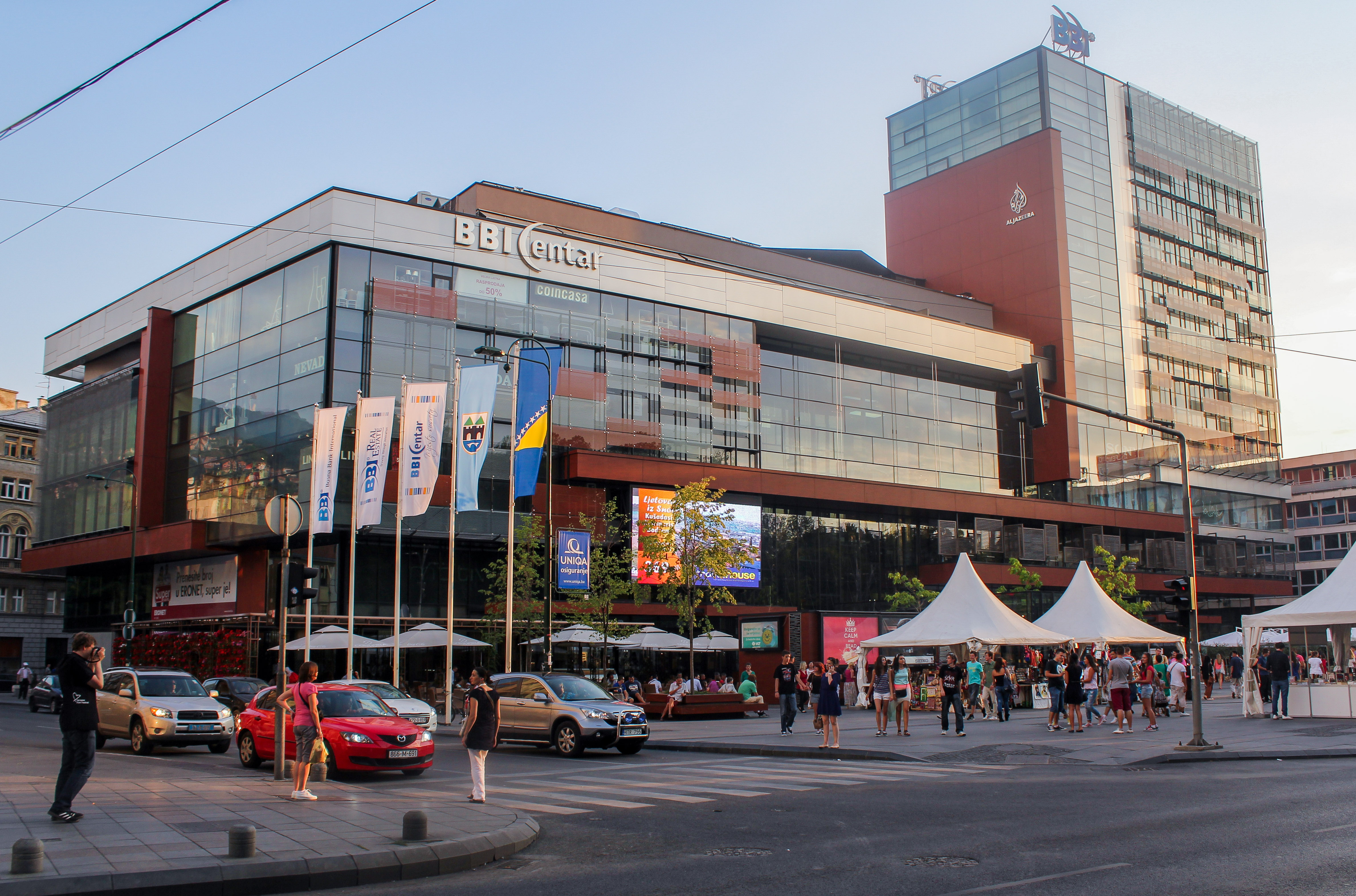
- ARIA Centar in August 2013
- Location: Sarajevo, Bosnia and Herzegovina
- Coordinates: 43°51′29″N 18°24′59″E
- Opened: April 2009
- Developer: BBI Real Estate d.o.o. Sarajevo
- Owner: Central Park Real Estate" d.o.o. Sarajevo
- Architect: Sead Gološ
- Floor area: 43,000 square metres (460,000 sq ft)
- Floors: 10

ARIA Centar, formerly known as BBI Centar, is a shopping mall in the center of Sarajevo. It is one of the largest shopping malls in Bosnia and Herzegovina, with an area of 43,000 m^{2} (460,000 sq ft). It was opened on 6 April 2009. ARIA Centar was built on the site where Robna kuća Sarajka, a popular state-owned department store, stood during the time Bosnia and Herzegovina was part of SFR Yugoslavia. Construction took place between 2006 and 2009. The four middle floors are also home to Bosna Bank International, and formerly to the headquarters of Al Jazeera Balkans.

469 parking spaces with video surveillance are located on three underground floors. The square in front of ARIA Centar is a meeting place for the citizens of Sarajevo. Many events are held on the Square such as an art performance, children's playrooms, workshops, concerts, graduations and sporting events.

The International Council of Shopping Centers awarded ARIA Centar with the ReStore Award. This distinction of European Shopping Centre Awards rewards both the developer and the local authority for a successful partnership that delivers a sustainable result for the local and regional community. The European Shopping Center Awards are the supreme awards in European retail property.

In October 2022, BBI Centar was renamed to ARIA Centar.

== Net floor area specification ==
- Retail 12,200 m^{2} (131,000 sq ft)
- Office 2,700 m^{2} (29,000 sq ft)
- Restaurant 1,800 m^{2} (19,000 sq ft)
- Storage 2,000 m^{2} (22,000 sq ft)
- Parking 14,600 m^{2} (157,000 sq ft)
- Services 9,700 m^{2} (104,000 sq ft)

== See also ==
- List of shopping malls in Sarajevo
