= Anti-Serb riots in Sarajevo =

Riots after the assassination of Archduke Franz Ferdinand in 1914

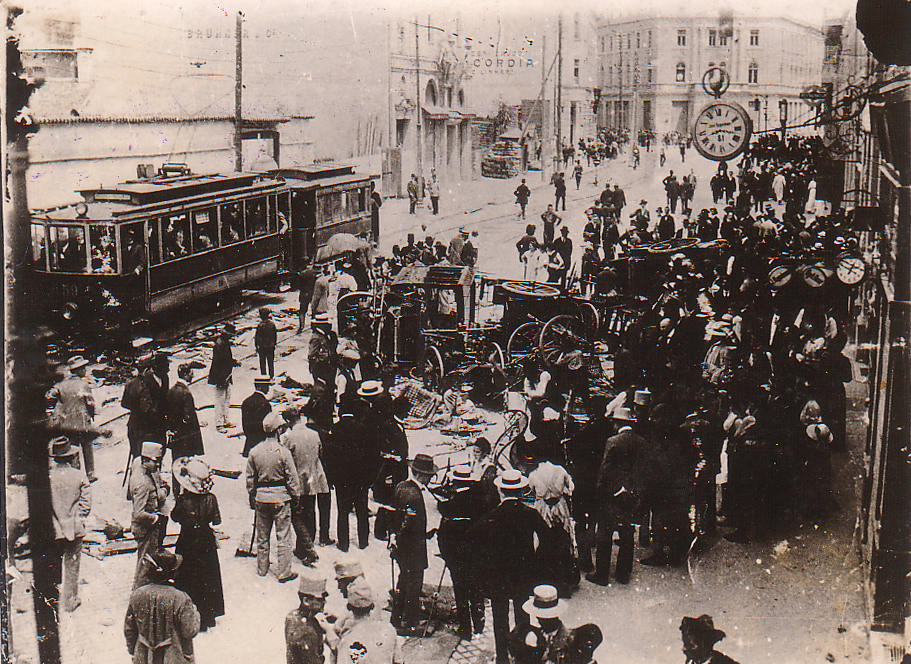
- A crowd gathered around piles of destroyed Serb property in Sarajevo, 29 June 1914
- Date: 28–29 June 1914
- Location: Sarajevo, Bosnia and Herzegovina, Austria-Hungary
- Cause: Anti-Serb sentiment in the aftermath of the assassination of Archduke Franz Ferdinand
- Participants: Bosnian Muslim and Croat population in Sarajevo, encouraged by the Austrian authorities
- Deaths: 2 Serbs killed
- Property damage: Numerous houses and buildings owned by Serbs
- Inquiries: More than 100 Serbs arrested on suspicions of supporting the assassins of Franz Ferdinand; 58 non-Serbs arrested

Anti-Serb riots, consisting of large-scale violence against Serbs, occurred in Sarajevo on 28 and 29 June 1914 after the assassination of Archduke Franz Ferdinand. Encouraged by the Austro-Hungarian government, the violent demonstrations assumed the characteristics of a pogrom, which led to ethnic divisions that were unprecedented in the city's history. Two Serbs were killed on the first day of the demonstrations, and many others were attacked. Numerous houses, shops and institutions owned by Serbs were razed or pillaged.

== Background ==
In the aftermath of the assassination of Archduke Franz Ferdinand by the 19-year-old Bosnian Serb student Gavrilo Princip, anti-Serb sentiment ran high throughout Austria-Hungary and resulted in violence against Serbs. On the night of the assassination, countrywide anti-Serb riots and demonstrations were organised in other parts of Austria-Hungary took place, particularly on the territory of modern-day Bosnia and Herzegovina and Croatia. As Princip's co-conspirators were mostly ethnic Serbs and members of an organisation of Serbs, Croats and Muslims called Young Bosnia (Serbo-Croatian: Mlada Bosna), which was dedicated to South Slav union, the Austro-Hungarian government soon became convinced that the Kingdom of Serbia had been behind the assassination. Pogroms against ethnic Serbs were organised immediately after the assassination and lasted for days. They were organised and encouraged by Oskar Potiorek, the Austro-Hungarian governor of Bosnia and Herzegovina who had been responsible for the security of the Archduke and his wife on the day of the assassination. The first anti-Serb demonstrations, led by the followers of Josip Frank, were organized in early evening of 28 June in Zagreb. The following day, anti-Serb demonstrations in the city became more violent and could be characterised as a pogrom. The police and local authorities in the city did nothing to prevent the anti-Serb violence.

== Riots ==
=== 28 June 1914 ===
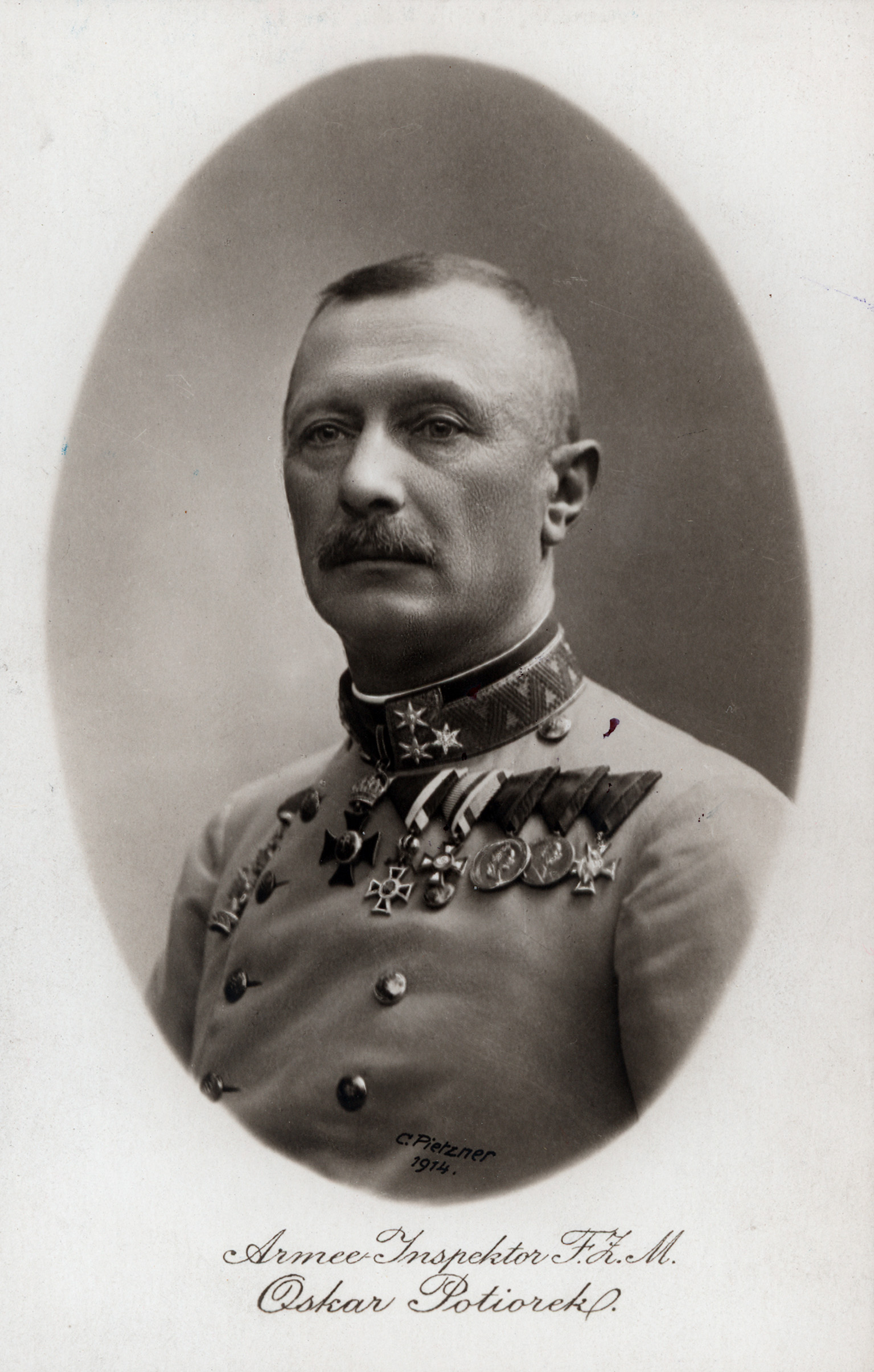
Oskar Potiorek, the Austro-Hungarian governor of Bosnia and Herzegovina, incited anti-Serb riots.

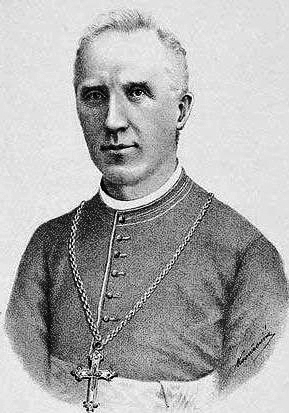
Josip Štadler agreed to eradicate "subversive elements of this land".

Anti-Serb demonstrations in Sarajevo began on 28 June 1914, a little later than those in Zagreb. Ivan Šarić, the assistant of the Roman Catholic Bishop of Bosnia, Josip Štadler, scratched anti-Serb verse anthems in which he described Serbs as "vipers" and "ravening wolves". A mob of Croats and Bosnian Muslims first gathered at Štadler's palace, the Sacred Heart Cathedral. Then, at around 10 o'clock in the evening, a group of 200 people attacked and destroyed the Hotel Evropa, the largest hotel in Sarajevo, which was owned by the Serb merchant Gligorije Jeftanović. The crowds directed their anger principally at Serb shops, residences of prominent Serbs, Serbian Orthodox places of worship, schools, banks, the Serb cultural society Prosvjeta and the Srpska riječ newspaper offices. Many members of the Austro-Hungarian upper class participated in the violence, including many military officers. Two Serbs were killed. The bishop of Mostar-Duvno Alojzije Mišić was one of the very few Catholic priests to denounce the anti-Serb violence.

I was a witness when the mob destroyed the Serbian shops, one after the other. The police appeared only when the whole business was over and when the mob started to plunder a different place.... The scum of the streets broke into private flats, destroying everything they could lay their hands on and grabbing all the valuables.

— The demonstrations described by the correspondent of the Frankfurter Zeitung,

Later that night, following the brief intervention of ten armed soldiers on horses, order was restored in the city. That night, an agreement was reached between the provincial government of Bosnia and Herzegovina, which was led by Oskar Potiorek, the city police and Štadler with his assistant Ivan Šarić to eradicate the "subversive elements of this land." The city government issued a proclamation and invited the population of Sarajevo to fulfill their holy duty and clean its city of the shame through eradication of the subversive elements. The proclamation was printed on the posters, which were distributed and displayed over the city during that night and the early morning of the following day. According to the statement of Josip Vancaš, who was one of the signatories of this proclamation, the author of its text was the government's commissioner for Sarajevo, who composed it based on the agreement with higher representatives of the government and Baron Collas.

=== 29 June 1914 ===
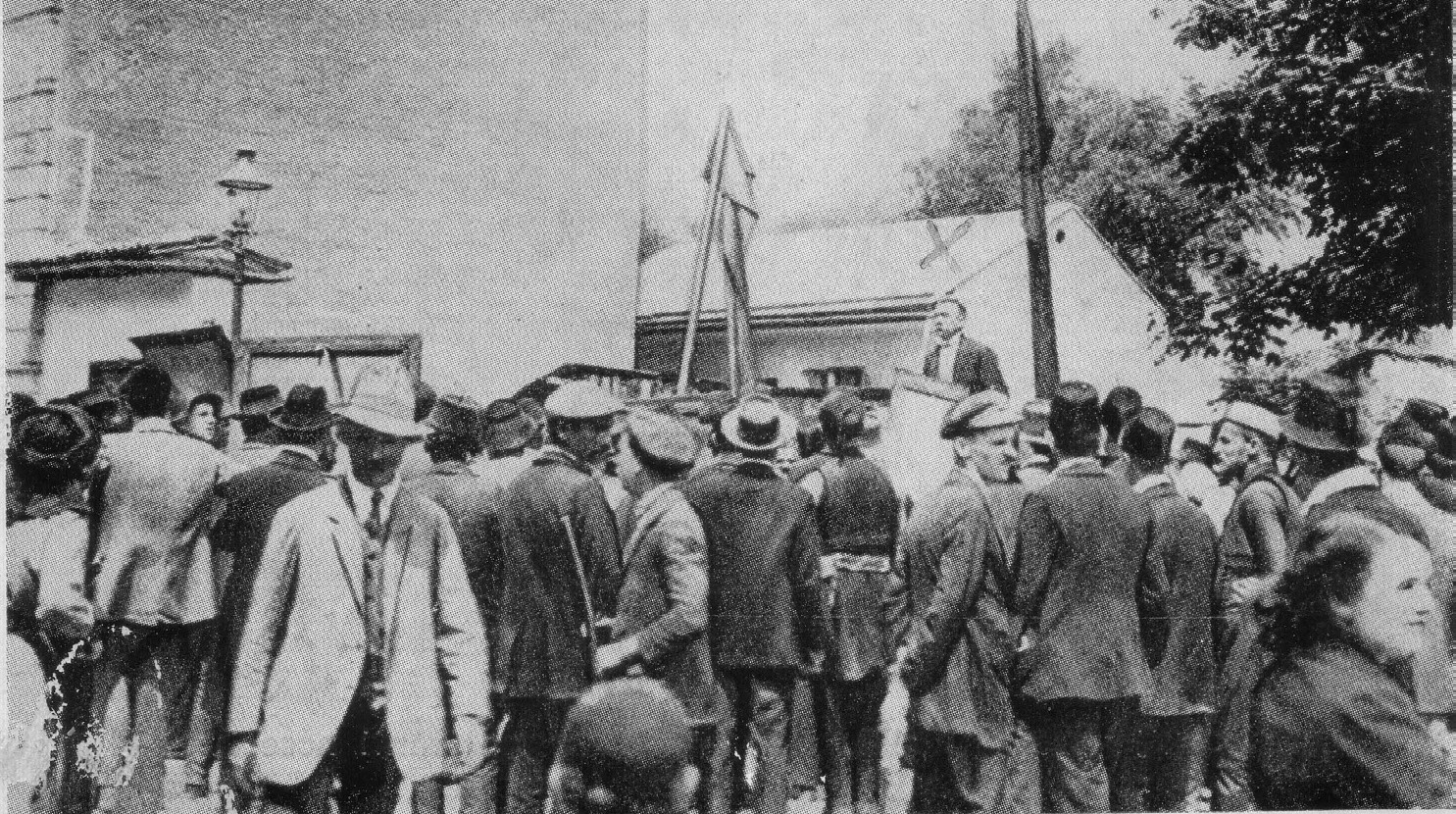
Josip Vancaš addressing a crowd in Sarajevo

On 29 June 1914, more aggressive demonstrations began at around 8 o'clock in the morning and quickly assumed the characteristics of a pogrom. Large groups of Muslims and Croats gathered on the streets of Sarajevo, shouted, sang and carried black-draped Austrian flags and pictures of the Austrian emperor and the late archduke. Local political leaders held speeches to these crowds. Josip Vancaš was one of those who gave a speech before violence had erupted. His exact role in the events is unknown, but some of the political leaders certainly played an important role in bringing crowds together and directing them against shops and houses belonging to Serbs. Political leaders disappeared after their speeches, and many fast-moving smaller groups of Croats and Muslims began attacking all property belonging to Sarajevo Serbs that they could reach. They first attacked one Serb school and then shops and other institutions and private houses owned by Serbs. A bank owned by a Serb was sacked while goods taken from shops and houses of Serbs were spread on the sidewalks and streets.

That evening, Potiorek declared a state of siege in Sarajevo and later in the rest of the province. Although the measures authorised law enforcement to deal with irregular activities they were not completely successful because mobs continued to attack Serbs and their property. Official reports stated that the Serb Orthodox Cathedral and Metropolitan seat in the city were spared by the intervention of Austro-Hungarian security forces. After the corpses of Franz Ferdinand and his wife were transported to Sarajevo's railway station, order in the city was restored. Further, the Austro-Hungarian government issued a decree, which established a special court for Sarajevo authorised to impose the death penalty for acts of murder and violence committed during the riots.

== Gallery ==
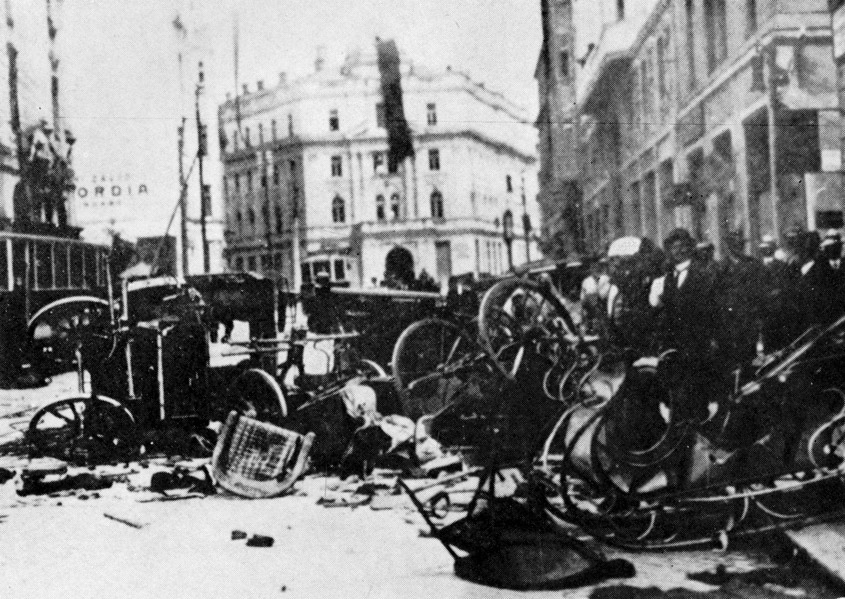
Main street of Sarajevo
(today's Marshal Tito street)

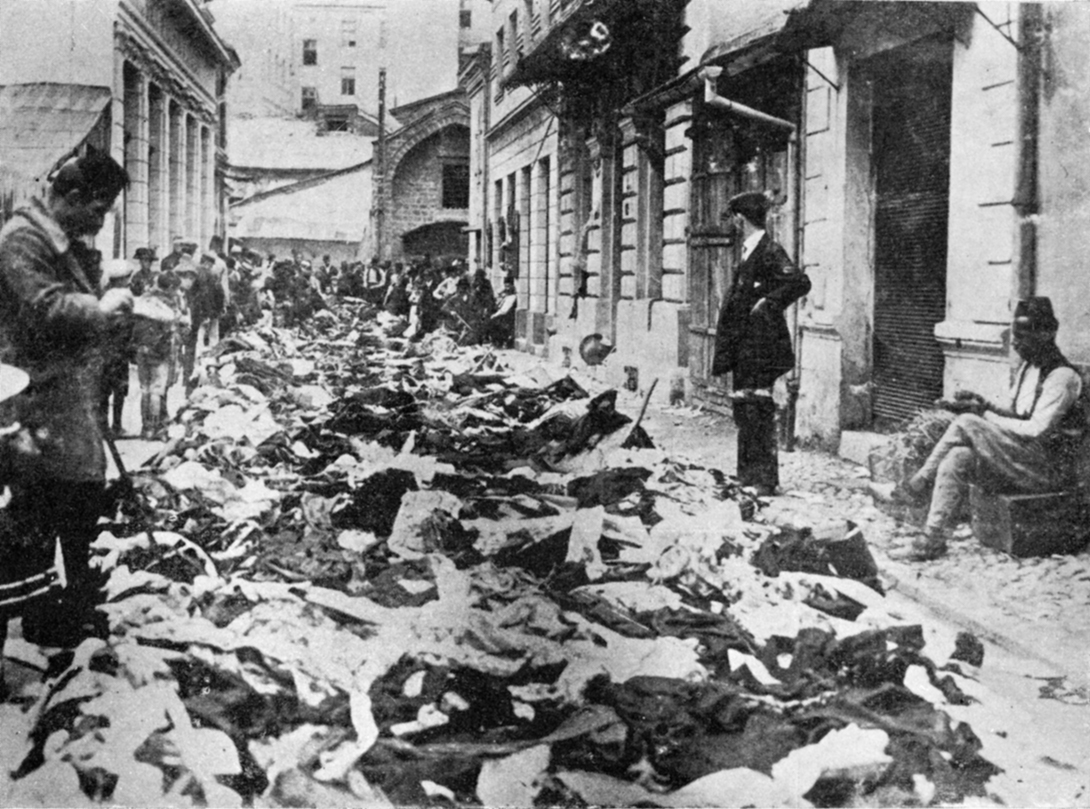
Baščaršija, near the Bezistan

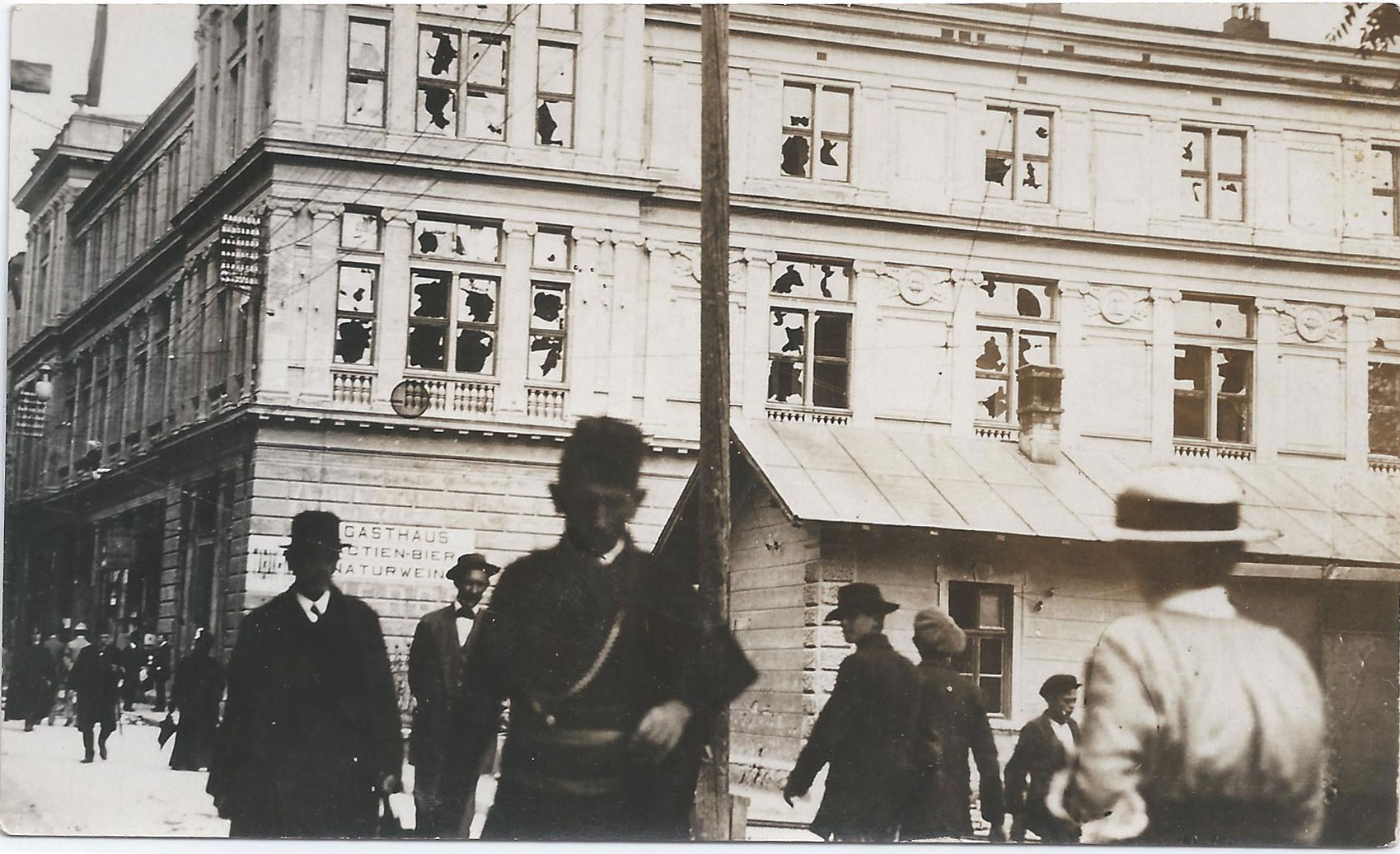
Vandalized Serb school in Sarajevo

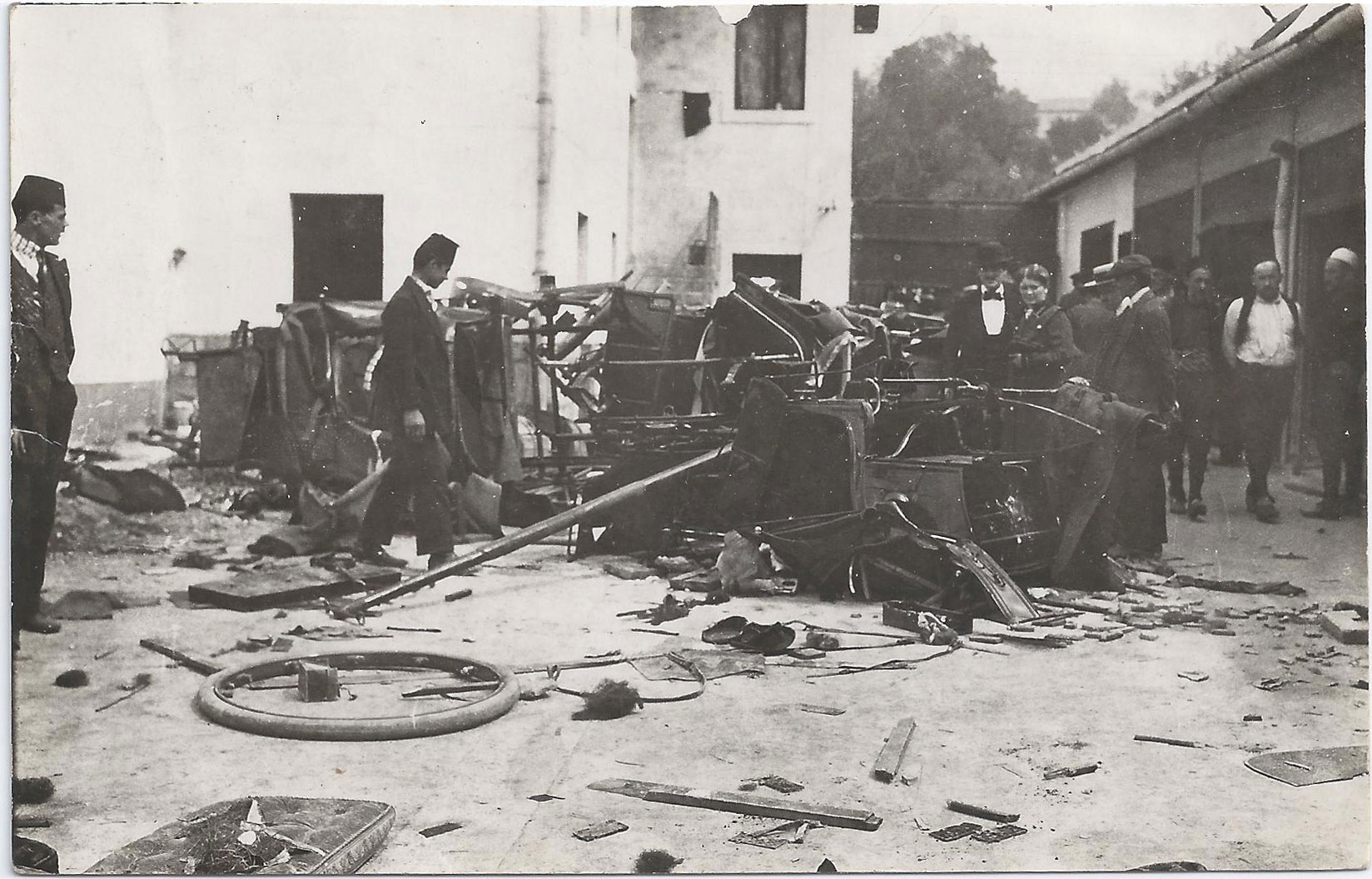
Destroyed garage of Hotel Evropa

== Reactions ==
=== People of Sarajevo ===
A group of notable Sarajevo politicians, consisting of Jozo Sunarić, Šerif Arnautović and Danilo Dimović, represented the three religious communities of Sarajevo, visited Potiorek and demanded him to take measures to prevent attacks against Serbs. In reports that Potiorek submitted to Vienna on 29 and 30 June, he stated that Serb shops in Sarajevo were completely destroyed and that even upper-class women participated in acts of looting and robbery. Many residents of Sarajevo applauded to the crowd and watched the events from their windows, and authorities reported that demonstrators enjoyed widespread support by the non-Serb population of the city.

The writer Ivo Andrić referred to the violence as the "Sarajevo frenzy of hate".

=== South Slavic politicians in Austria-Hungary ===
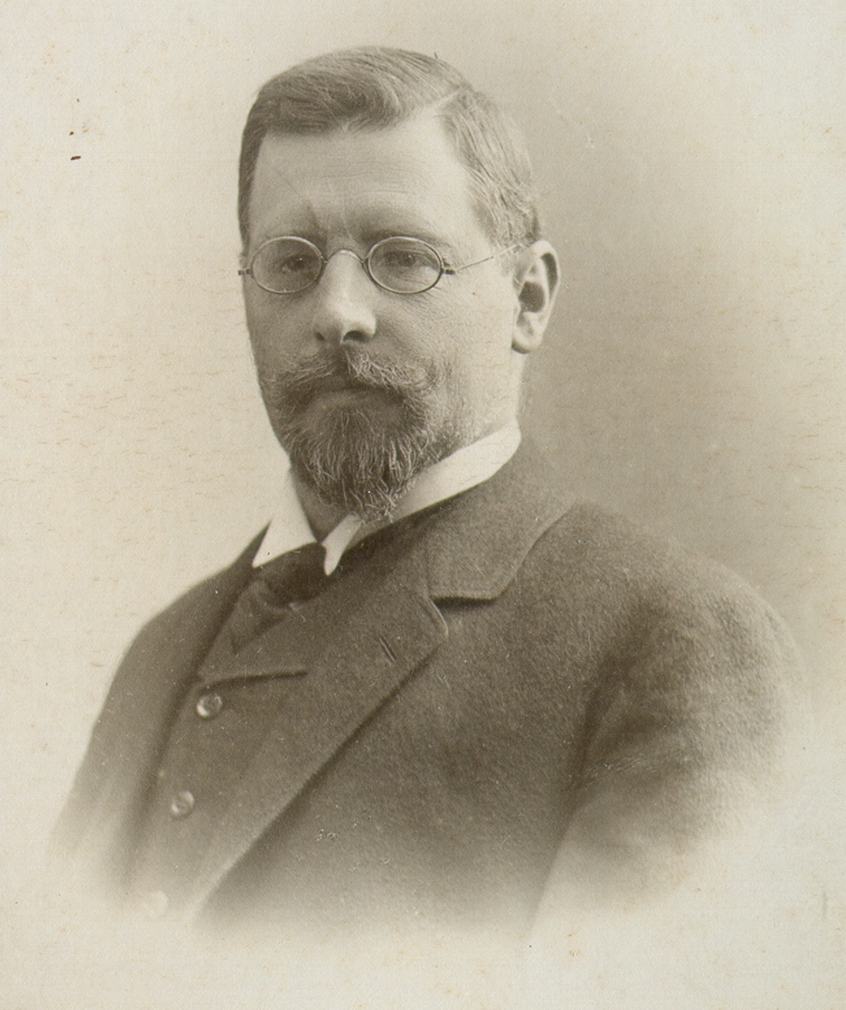
Slovenian conservative politician Ivan Šusteršič called for violence against Serbs in the aftermath of the riots.

According to the author Christopher Bennett, relations between Croats and Serbs in the empire would have spun out of control without the intervention of the Hungarian authorities. The Slovenian conservative politician Ivan Šusteršič called for non-Serbs "to shatter the skull of that Serb in whom voracious megalomania lived".

Except from the weak far-right political forces, the other South Slavs in Austria-Hungary, particularly those in Dalmatia and Muslim religious leaders in Bosnia and Herzegovina, either refrained from participating in anti-Serb violence or condemned it, but some of them openly expressed solidarity with the Serb people, including the newspapers of the Party of Rights, the Croat-Serb Coalition, and the Catholic Bishops Alojzije Mišić and Anton Bonaventura Jeglič. Until early July, it became obvious that the only support for the government's anti-Serb position came from the state-supported reactionaries, and some kind of South Slav solidarity with Serbs existed though still in an undeveloped form.

However, the authors Bideleux and Jeffries stated that Croatian political leaders displayed fierce loyalty to Austria-Hungary and noted that Croatians, in general, became significantly more engaged in the Austro-Hungarian armed forces at the outbreak of World War I. They commented on the higher proportion of front-line fighters to that the total population.

=== Newspapers and diplomats ===
The Catholic and official press in Sarajevo inflamed riots by publishing hostile anti-Serb pamphlets and rumours that claimed that Serbs carried hidden bombs. Sarajevo newspapers reported that riots against ethnic Serb civilians, and their property resembled "the aftermath of Russian pogroms". On 29 June, a conservative newspaper from Vienna reported, "Sarajevo looks like the scene of a pogrom". According to some reports, the police in Sarajevo permitted the riots to occur. Some reports state that Austro-Hungarian authorities stood by while Sarajevo Serbs were killed and their property burned. The anti-Serb riots had an important effect on the position of the Russian Empire. A Russian newspaper reported that "the responsibility for the events is not on Serbia but on those who pushed Austria into Bosnia so Russia's moral obligation is to protect the Slavic people of Bosnia and Herzegovina from the German yoke". According to Milorad Ekmečić, one Russian report stated that more than 1,000 houses and shops were destroyed in Sarajevo.

The Italian consul in Sarajevo stated that the events had been financed by the Austro-Hungarian government. The German consul, described as being "anything but a friend of Serbs", reported that Sarajevo was experiencing its own St. Bartholomew's Day massacre.

== Aftermath ==
Two Serbs, Pero Prijavić and Nikola Nožičić, died some days later as a result of the injuries that they had sustained after being beaten. Fifty people were treated at Sarajevo hospitals as a result of the two-day rioting. A Croat, who was shot by a Serb defending his brothers' spice shop, also died. A Muslim committed suicide over rumours that a bomb had been found in his possession. Whole stocks of goods as well as monies from Serb shops and homes were gone from the plundering. The devastation left a profound impact on Serb-owned business and industry given the minority Sarajevo Serb population's prominence in those areas.

=== Incidents in other locations ===
Anti-Serb demonstrations and riots were organized not only in Sarajevo and Zagreb but also in many other larger Austro-Hungarian cities, including Đakovo, Petrinja and Slavonski Brod in modern-day Croatia, as well as in Čapljina, Livno, Bugojno, Travnik, Maglaj, Mostar, Zenica, Tuzla, Doboj, Vareš, Brčko and Bosanski Šamac in modern-day Bosnia and Herzegovina. The Austro-Hungarian government's attempts to organise anti-Serb demonstrations in Dalmatia encountered the least success, as only a small number of people participated in anti-Serb protests in Split and Dubrovnik, but in Šibenik, a number of shops owned by Serbs were plundered.

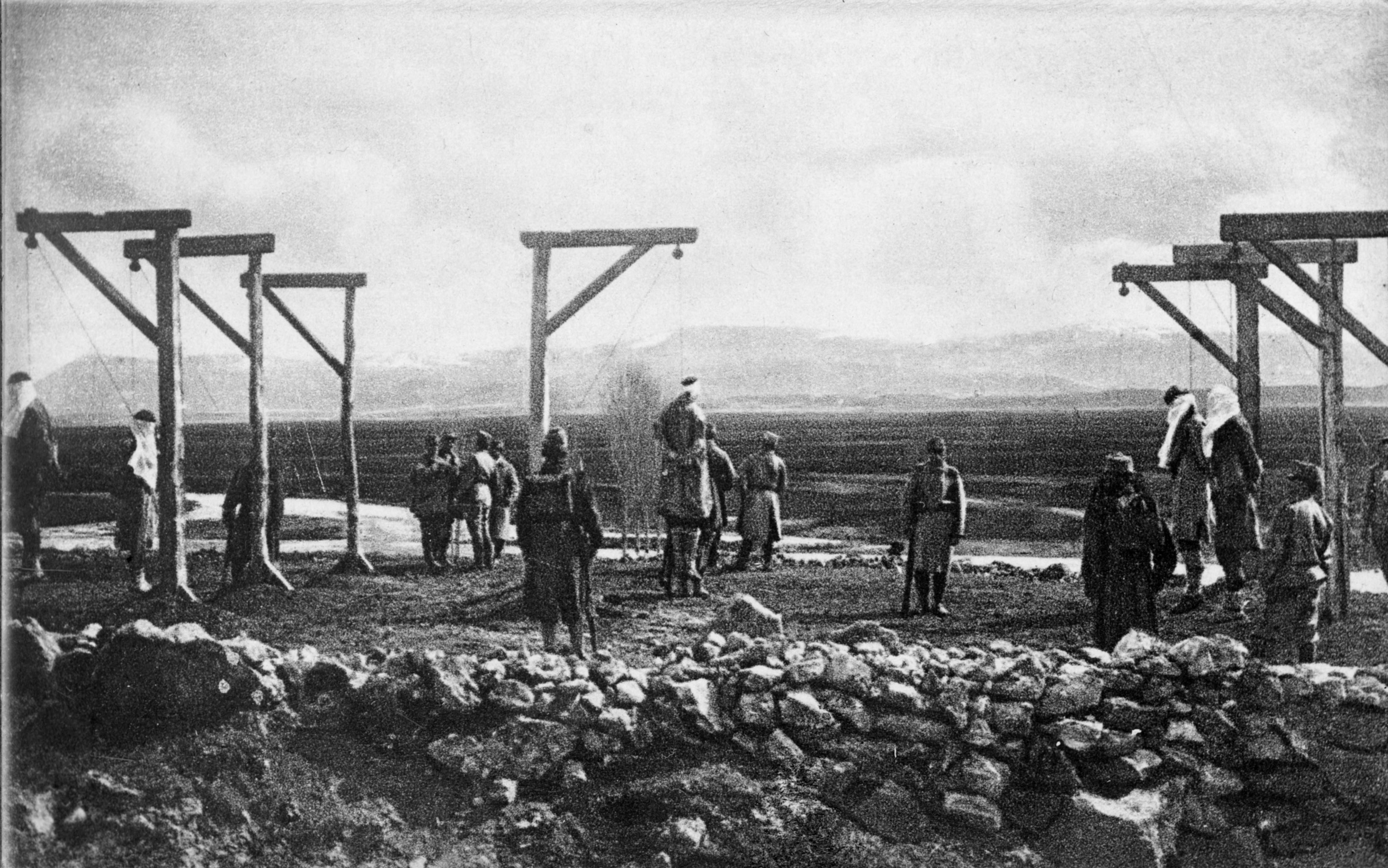
Austro-Hungarian troops hanging Serbs in the Herzegovina region

=== Schutzkorps ===
Austro-Hungarian authorities in Bosnia and Herzegovina imprisoned and extradited approximately 5,500 prominent Serbs, 700 to 2,200 of whom died in prison; 460 Serbs were sentenced to death; and a predominantly-Muslim special militia, known as the Schutzkorps, was established and carried out the persecution of Serbs. Consequently, around 5,200 Serb families were expelled from Bosnia and Herzegovina. That was the first persecution of a substantial number of citizens of Bosnia and Herzegovina because of their ethnicity and was, as the Slovene author Velikonja described, "an ominous harbinger of things to come."

== Sources ==
- Bennett, Christopher (1995). Yugoslavia's Bloody Collapse: Causes, Course and Consequences. C. Hurst & Co. Publishers. ISBN 978-1-85065-228-1.
- Dedijer, Vladimir (1966). The Road to Sarajevo. Simon and Schuster. ASIN B0007DMDI2.
- Donia, Robert J. (2006). Sarajevo: A Biography. University of Michigan Press. ISBN 978-0-472-11557-0.
- Ekmečić, Milorad (1973). Ratni ciljevi Srbije 1914. Srpska književna zadruga.
- Jannen, William (1996). Lions of July: Prelude to War, 1914. Presidio. ISBN 978-0-89141-569-5.
- Mitrović, Andrej (2007). Serbia's Great War, 1914–1918. Purdue University Press. ISBN 978-1-55753-477-4.
- Tomasevich, Jozo (2001). War and Revolution in Yugoslavia, 1941–1945: Occupation and Collaboration. Stanford University Press. ISBN 978-0-8047-7924-1.
- Velikonja, Mitja (2003). Religious Separation and Political Intolerance in Bosnia-Herzegovina. Texas A&M University Press. p. 141. ISBN 978-1-58544-226-3.
- Bideleux, Robert; Jeffries, Ian (15 November 2006). The Balkans: A Post-Communist History. Routledge. p. 188. ISBN 978-0-203-96911-3.
- Lyon, James (2015). Serbia and the Balkan Front, 1914: The Outbreak of the Great War. Bloomsbury Publishing. ISBN 978-1-47258-005-4.
