= Hotel Europe (Sarajevo) =

Hotel in Sarajevo, Bosnia and Herzegovina

Coordinates: 43.8583°N 18.4272°E

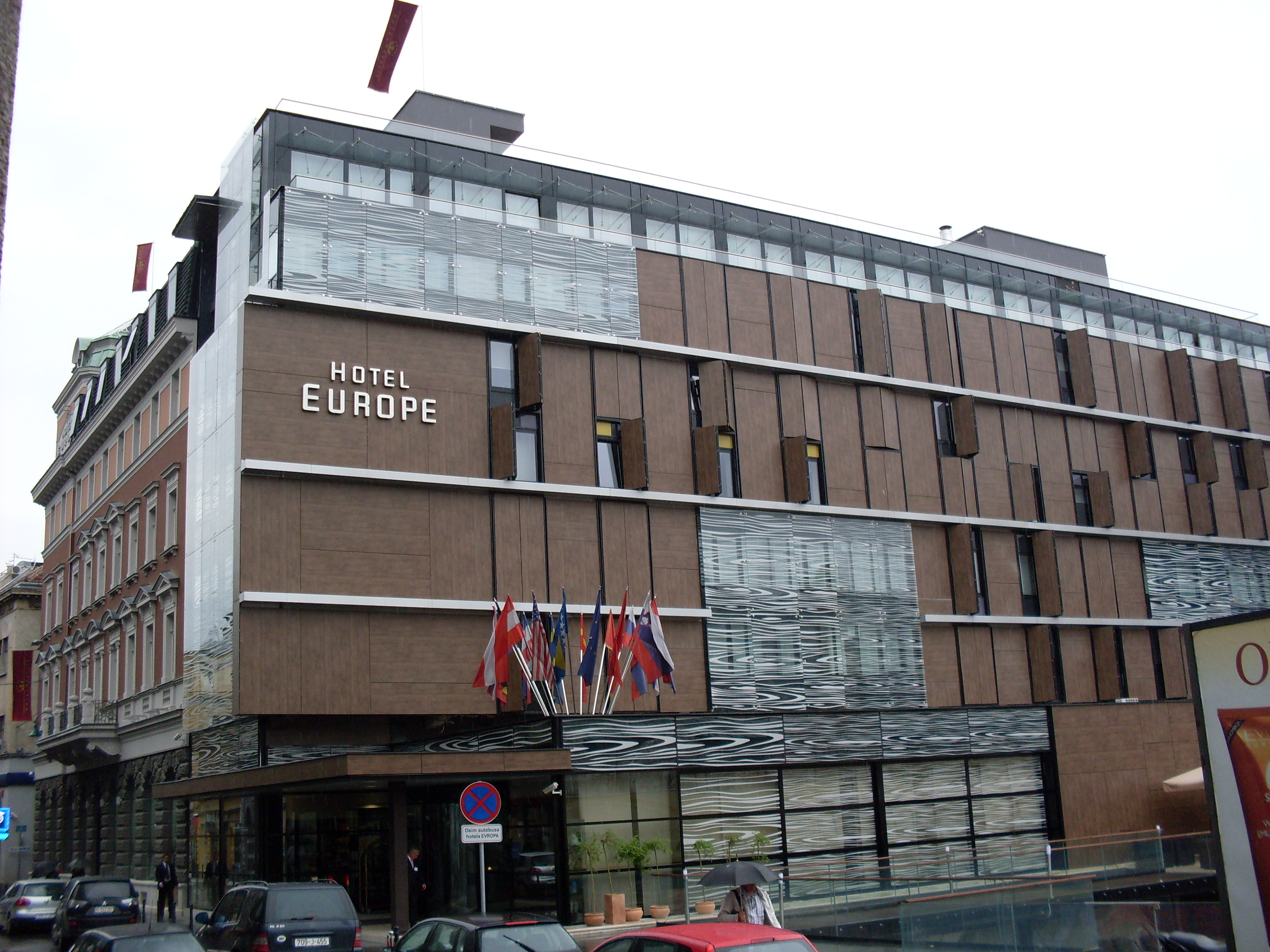
- Interactive map of the Hotel Europe area
- Former names: Hotel Evropa (1882–1992); Hotel Europe (2008–present)

General information
- Location: Stari Grad, Sarajevo, Bosnia and Herzegovina, 8 Vladislava Skarića Street; Sarajevo 71000, B-H Federation, Bosnia and Herzegovina
- Opening: 12 December 1882
- Owner: Rasim Bajrović
- Management: Europa d.d.

Design and construction
- Architects: Karel Pařík (1882); Sead Gološ (2007 renovation)

Other information
- Number of rooms: 160
- Number of suites: 14

Website
- Hotel Europe

Hotel Europe (originally known as Hotel Evropa) is a historic hotel in central Sarajevo.

Built in the early days of the forty-year Austro-Hungarian occupation of Bosnia and Herzegovina, the hotel holds a special place in the city's lore as its first modern hospitality venue. Over its almost century and a half long existence, the hotel saw many changes often brought upon by sudden geopolitical events, reflecting the city's turbulent political and social history.

For sixty years, from its grand opening in 1882 until World War II, Hotel Evropa was owned and run by the Jeftanović family, father and son Gliša and Dušan, respectively, Serb merchants and industrialists from Sarajevo. During the communist period in Yugoslavia from 1945 until 1990, the hotel was nationalized and run by various state-owned entities such as HTP Evropa. After the Bosnian War, the property has been re-privatized in 2006 by the Sandžak-born Bosniak businessman Rasim Bajrović who re-opened the venue in 2008, this time under the modified name Hotel Europe.

== Location ==
Hotel Europe is located at Vladislava Skarića Street in the central part of Sarajevo's Stari Grad municipality.

It overlooks the Gazi-Husrev Beg's Bezistan and the ruins of the former Tašlihan while it is a short walking distance away from the Latin Bridge, Despić House, Baščaršija, Sahatkula, Ferhadija pedestrian promenade, and other sites of interest.

== History ==
=== Jeftanović ownership ===
Funded by wealthy merchant and industrialist Gligorije "Gliša" Jeftanović (1841-1927), the site near the former Tašlihan, a mid-15th century caravanserai that burned down in the great fire of August 1879, was selected as the location for a new hotel. The building design was commissioned to architect Karel Pařík. Hotel Evropa officially opened on Tuesday, 12 December 1882 and right away Jeftanović leased the premises to Edvard Lasslauer who began running the hotel's day-to-day operations.

Opened four and a half years since Austria-Hungary had occupied the Ottoman Empire's Bosnia Vilayet and had de facto been governing the territory as another one of its provinces, the hotel very much reflected the newly imposed k. und k. cultural model. As the first of its kind in Sarajevo, the venue became the focus of the city's embryonic hospitality and tourist industries. In addition to lodging, it offered entertainment and leisure options with in-house establishments like Bečka kafana and Zlatni restoran, night club Plavi podrum, and the hotel garden. Though operating as part of the hotel, these establishments also managed to create an identity of their own, becoming instantly popular so that they began to be frequented not just by the hotel guests, but also by the city inhabitants. Drawing on various aspects of the Viennese and Germanic cultures, the social concept of Stammtisch was introduced to the city. Furthermore, Bečka kafana incorporated Wiener Kaffeehaus details such as Zeitungsständer (newspaper stand) and wallpapers depicting secessionist and Schönbrunn interior motifs, while Zlatni restoran offered desserts like Apfelstrudel, Kuglof, and Sachertorte.

By the early 1900s, the aging Gliša Jeftanović handed the reins of many of his business holdings—including Hotel Evropa—over to his son Dušan (1884-1941), a juris doctor by profession.

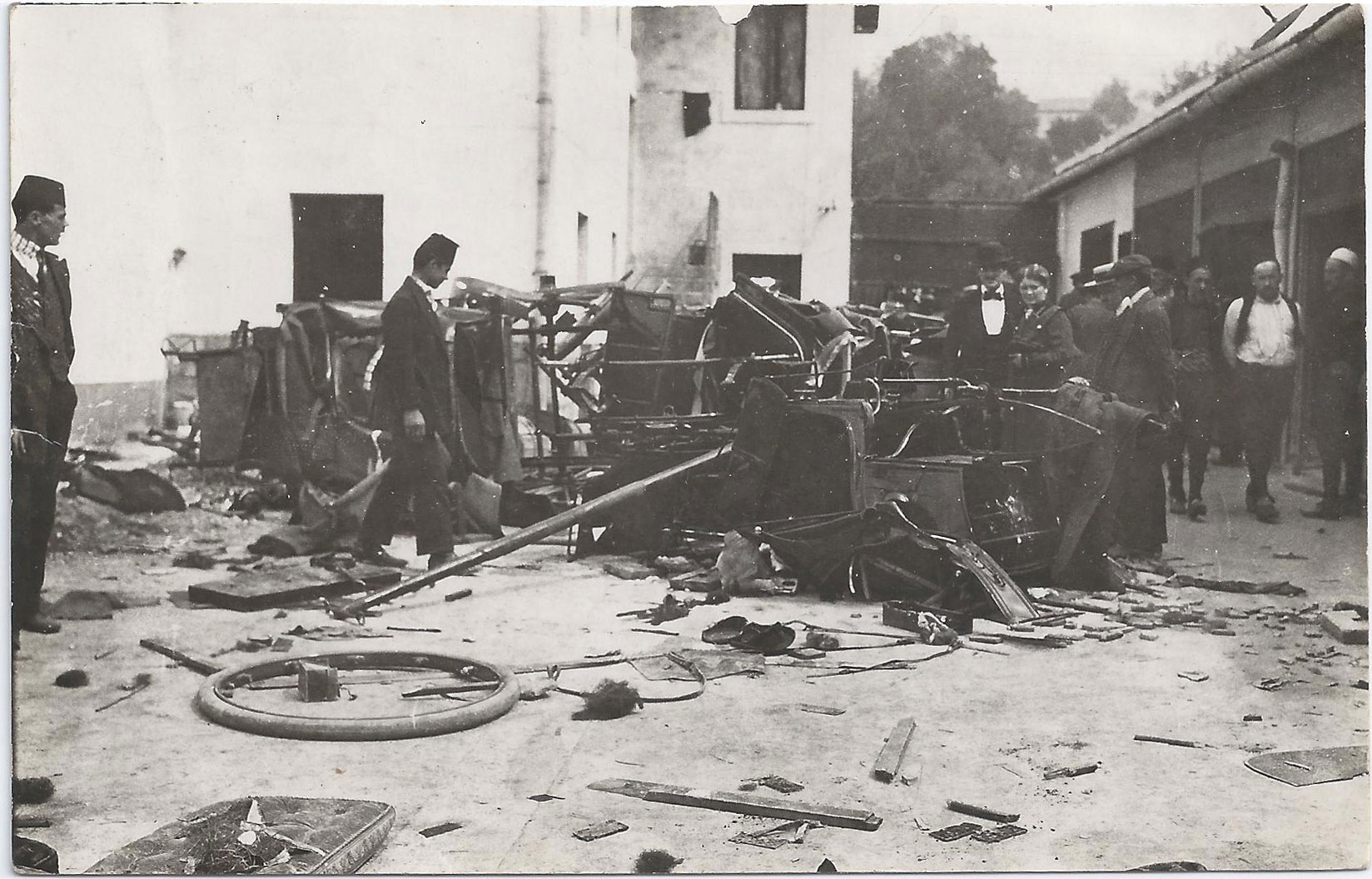
Destroyed garage of Hotel Evropa after the Anti-Serb riots in Sarajevo, 1914.

The hotel was attacked on 29 June 1914, during Anti-Serb riots in Sarajevo. Soon afterwards, with Austria-Hungary declaring war on Serbia and with the conflict expanding into World War I, the Austro-Hungarian Army occupied part of Hotel Evropa by the joint decision of the government's Sarajevo trustee and the Sarajevo Fortress military command. In late October 1914, Gliša Jeftanović received a cable from the Sarajevo vice-mayor Damjanović, informing him about the minimal compensation he would be receiving for k. und k. officers and soldiers using the first two floors of his hotel.

With the 6 April 1941 Nazi German invasion of the Yugoslav kingdom, the country was quickly dismembered into several client states, the biggest of which was the Ustaše-run Independent State of Croatia that swallowed up all of Bosnia including the city of Sarajevo. German units marched into Sarajevo on 15 April, setting the scene for the first Ustaše contingent to enter the city en route from Zagreb during the night of 23–24 April. Within weeks of their arrival, on 5 May 1941 Ustaše arrested dr. Dušan Jeftanović along with several other prominent Sarajevo Serbs. He was taken to Zagreb where for some time he had been detained in the Petrinjska Street police jail before Ustaše eventually executed him.

=== Nationalization ===
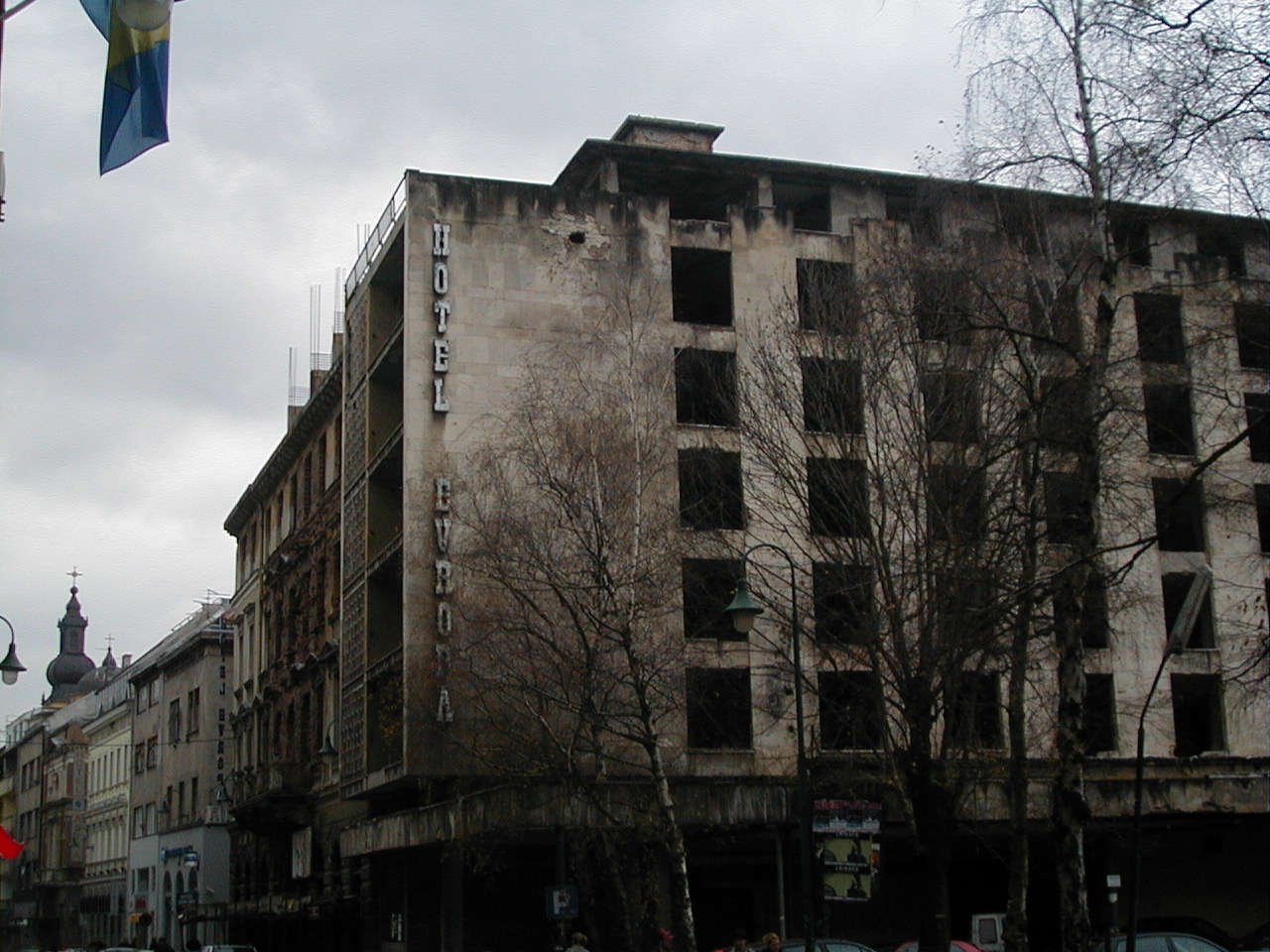
Hotel Evropa building in the 2000s, still in disrepair from the 1990s war damage and subsequent neglect.

After World War II, Hotel Evropa, along with the rest of the Jeftanović family property, was nationalized by the new communist authorities. Soon, another wing, built in the contemporary architectural style of the period, was added to the hotel.

During late November 1969, Hotel Evropa was the central venue for the events surrounding the Bitka na Neretvi premiere attended by the film's stars Yul Brynner, Orson Welles, Sergei Bondarchuk, Bata Živojinović, Ljubiša Samardžić, Sylva Koscina, and Milena Dravić as well as various Yugoslav political leaders including Marshal Tito and first lady Jovanka Broz. Other celebrities in town for the premiere were Welles' mistress Oja Kodar, Italian film producer Carlo Ponti, actress Božidarka Frajt, and European socialite Ira von Fürstenberg. With the city covered in heavy snow, the hotel hosted a dinner following the premiere.

Two and a half years later on 12 April 1972, following the Valter brani Sarajevo premiere, the hotel hosted an invitation-only dinner for the guests in town and local dignitaries, including the film's cast as well as the Red Star Belgrade head coach Miljan Miljanić, actress Špela Rozin, 1967 Miss Yugoslavia Aleksandra Mandić, Skenderija's director and former Sarajevo mayor Ljubo Kojo, Bosna Film chairman Neđo Parežanin, etc.

=== Re-privatization: Bajrović ownership ===
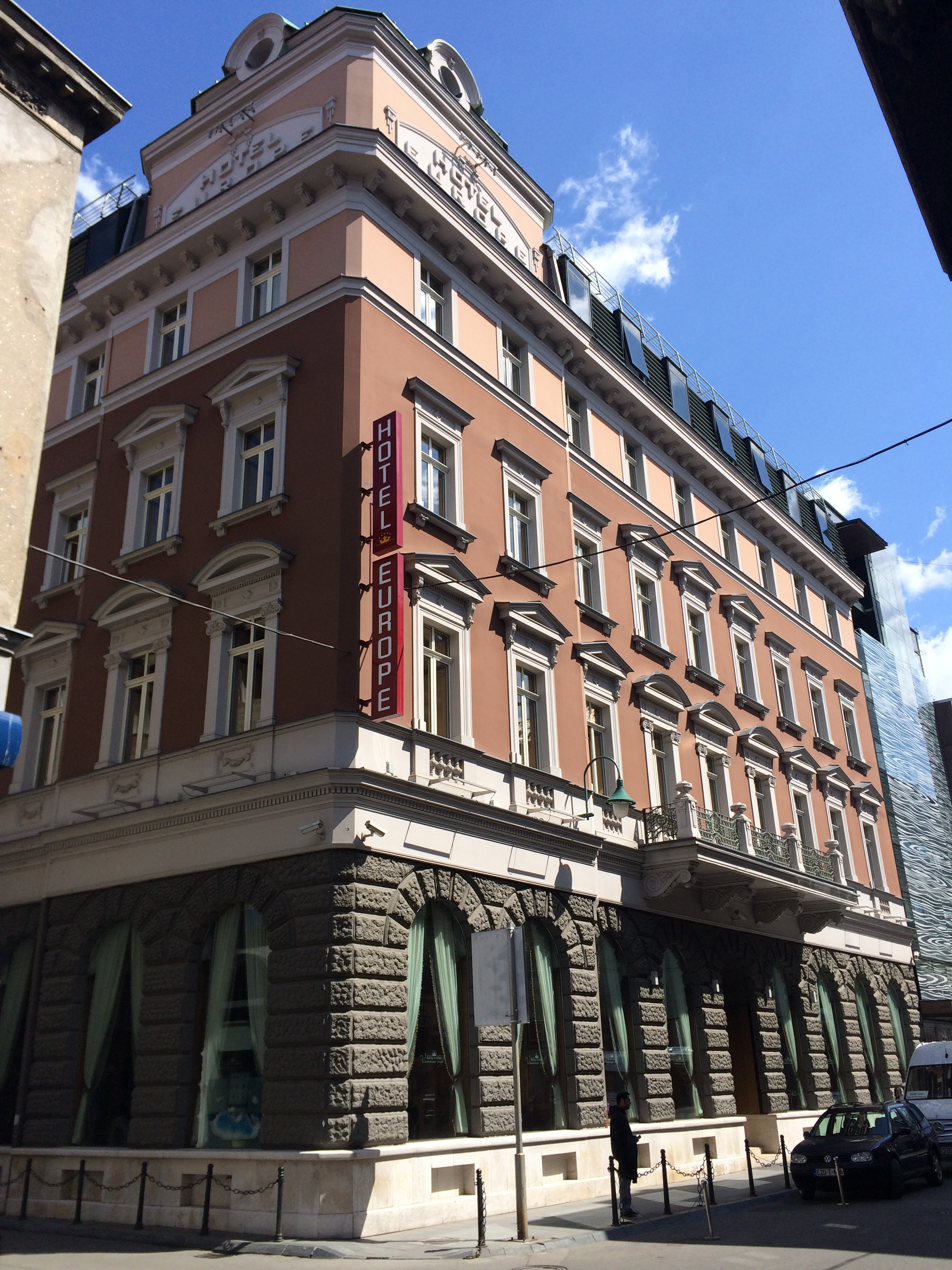
Hotel Europe in 2015.

The hotel was re-privatized in November 2006, reportedly for BAM9.4 million (€4.8 million), by the Sarajevo-based Rasim Bajrović-owned Astrea company, owner of another nearby hospitality venue: Hotel Astra. The Hotel Evropa building was restored in 2007, a project overseen by the Sarajevo-based architect Sead Gološ. The colour of the facade was chosen by the citizens of Sarajevo by ballot vote. It re-opened on 12 December 2008, on the 126th anniversary of its opening, with the Federation of Bosnia and Herzegovina prime minister Nedžad Branković and Sarajevo mayor Semiha Borovac on hand.

Hotel Europe's storied history continued drawing dignitaries. During an official state visit in July 2011, the Sarajevo-born Serbian president Boris Tadić had a photo-op meeting organized for him in the hotel's garden with local celebrities Dino Merlin, Halid Bešlić, and Ivica Osim. Also in the hotel, later that day, Tadić was given a medal by the European Movement's Bosnia branch.

At some point during the early 2010s, the name of the hotel's parent company, Astrea, was changed by Bajrović to Europa d.d.

In 2016, Bajrović purchased another marquee hospitality property in Sarajevo—former Holiday Inn hotel, originally built for the 1984 Winter Olympics and in disrepair since the Bosnian War—reportedly spending BAM42 million (~€21 million) for the transaction. Over the subsequent years, most of Bajrović's business efforts focused on renovating his new 240-room property that re-opened as Hotel Holiday.

In March 2020, at the start of the COVID-19 pandemic, Hotel Europe's owner Bajrović called on all levels of government in Bosnia and Herzegovina to help the country's collapsing tourism sector in order to save jobs. Simultaneously, all of the Europa d.d. company's employees had their employment temporarily suspended.

== Sources ==
- Džomić, Velibor V. (1995). Ustaški zločini nad srbskim sveštenicima [Ustaše crimes against Serbian priests] (in Serbian). Podgorica: Perun.
- Hoare, Marko Atilla (2013). Bosnian Muslims in the Second World War: A History. New York City: Oxford University Press Inc. ISBN 9780231703949.
