= Sead Gološ =

Bosnian architect (1969–2020)

Sead Gološ (8 June 1969 – 4 November 2020) was a Bosnian architect.

== Biography ==
Gološ was born in Sarajevo. He graduated in 1994 from the Faculty of Architecture of the University of Sarajevo. From 1996 to 2001, he worked for the Sarajevo City Development Institute, and then he joined the architectural firm GRUPA.ARH, for whom he also worked for 5 years in Abu Dhabi and Dubai from 2011 to 2016. He was an associate professor of architecture at the University of Sarajevo, and a member of the Council for urbanism, ecology and aesthetic planning of the City of Sarajevo. Gološ authored several landmark buildings in Sarajevo and beyond, changing the silhouette of the city in the 2010s. His works include:

- Project for the new headquarters of Al Jazeera Balkans in Šip, Sarajevo
- "Summit" Bau-Herc business building in Marijin Dvor (Maglajska 1), 2018
- Sarajevo City Center (SCC) shopping centre, 2014
- ARIA shopping centre, 2009
- Merkur shopping centre in Otoka
- Renovation of Hotel Europe, 2007
- Bosmal City Centre (residential and commercial complex), 2001
- tourism projects in Africa
- Autodelta, 2021

He died of COVID-19 on 4 November 2020, at the Podhrastovi clinic in Sarajevo, where he had been hospitalized 20 days earlier.

== Work ==
Bosmal City Center (2017)

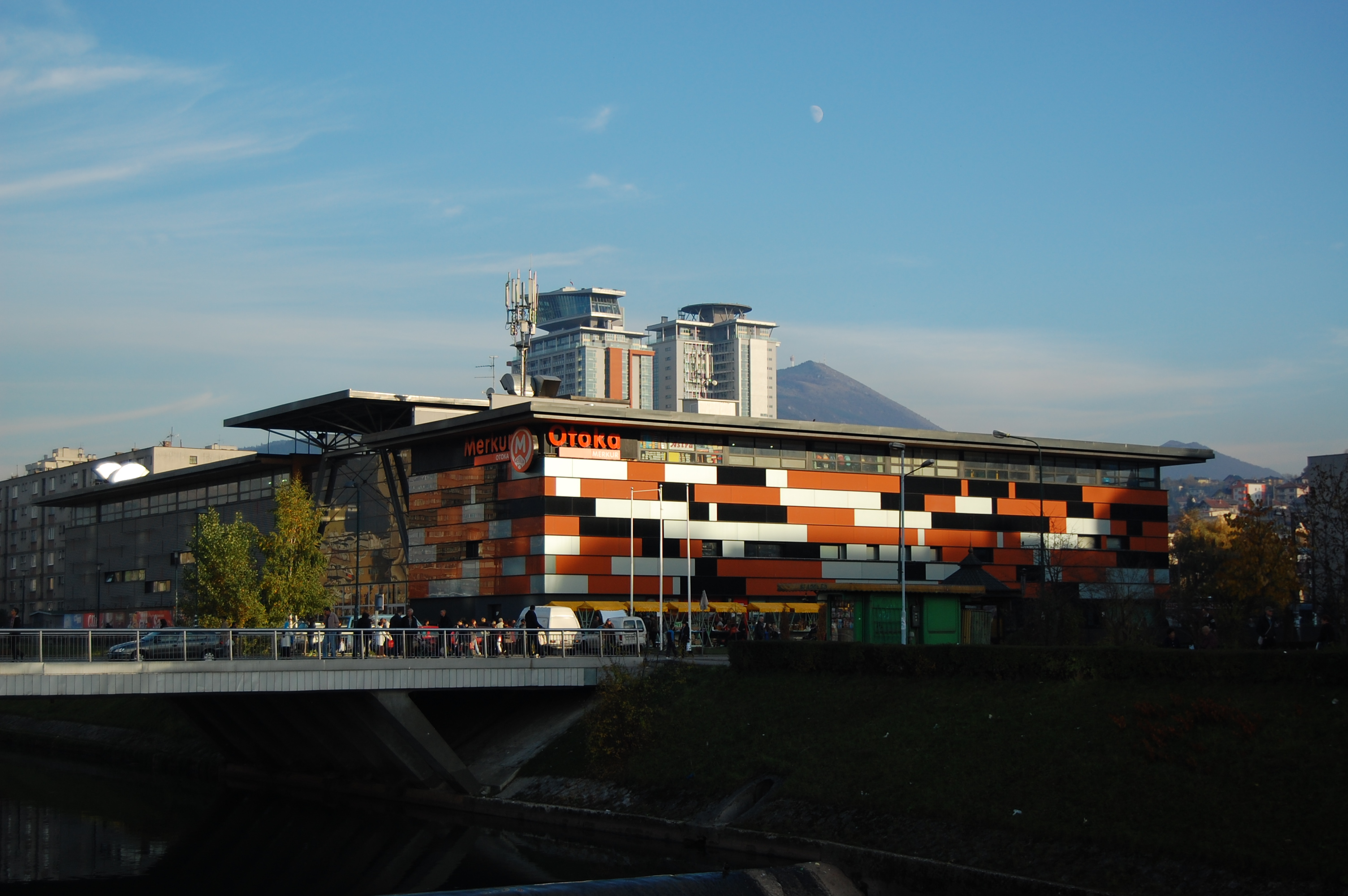
Merkur shopping centre in Otoka (2011)

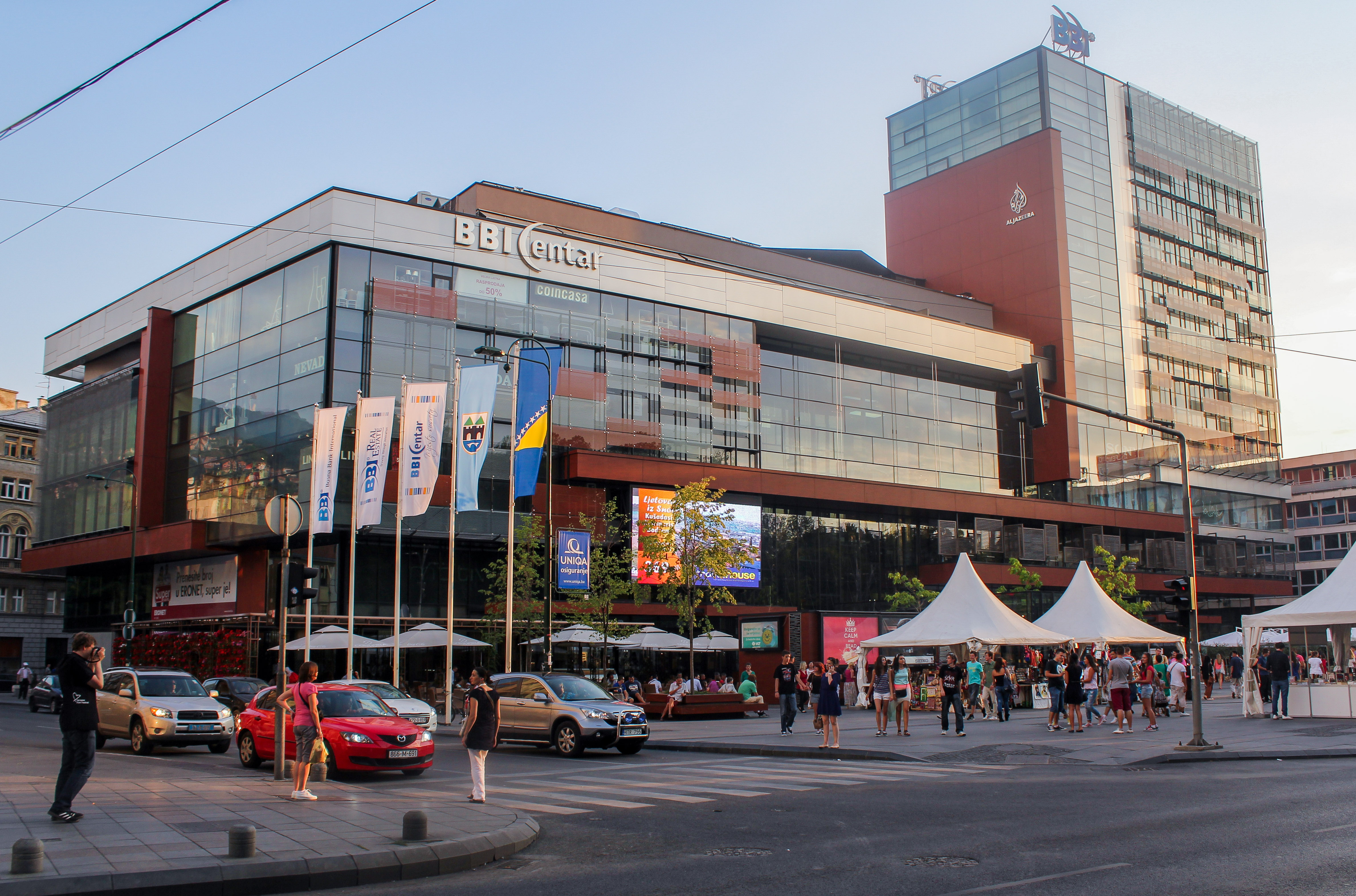
ARIA shopping centre (2009)

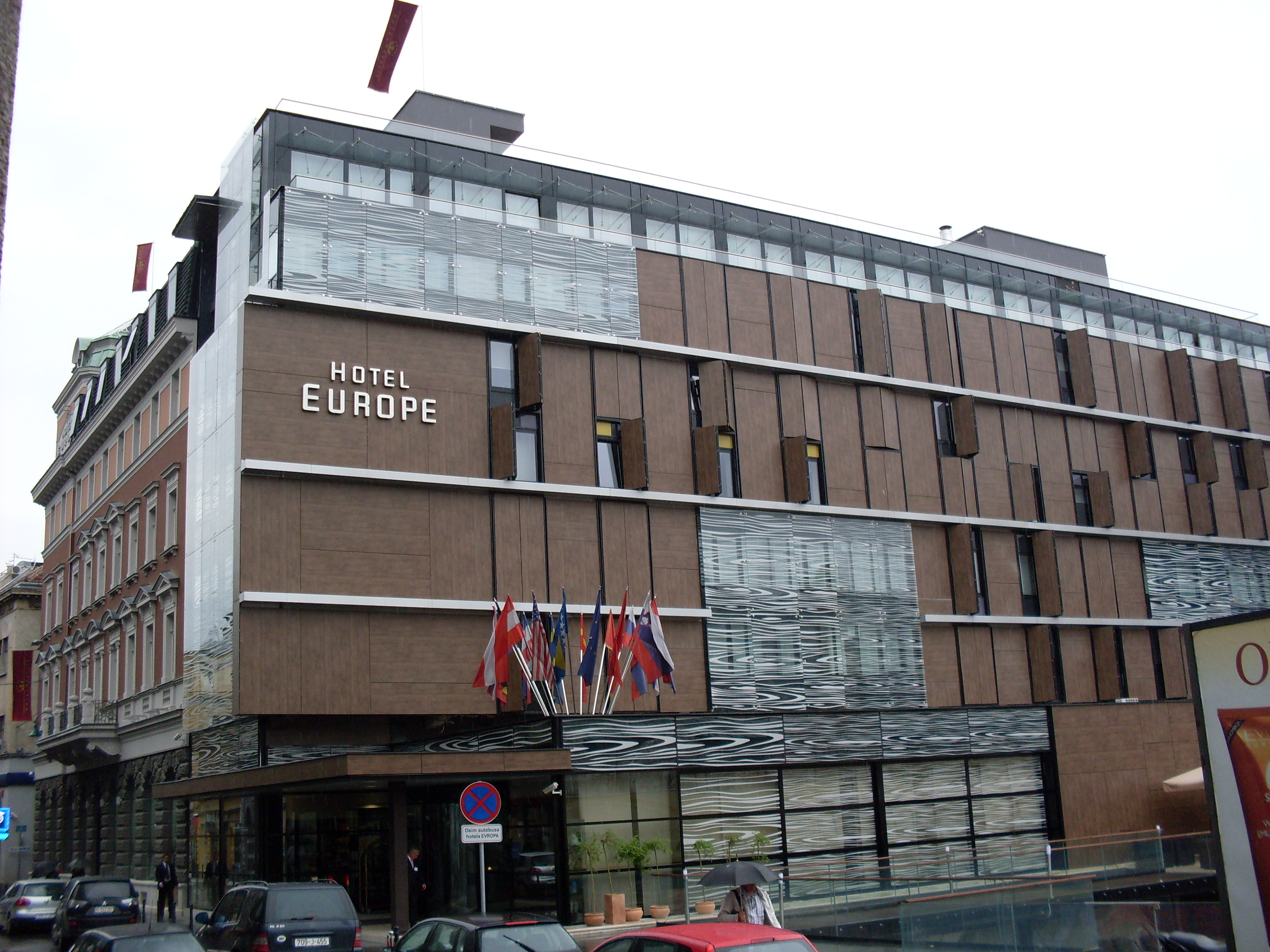
Hotel Europe (2007)
