= Sarajevo City Center =

- Interactive map of the Sarajevo City Center area

General information
- Location: Sarajevo, Bosnia and Herzegovina
- Coordinates: 43°51′19.38″N 18°24′27.69″E
- Construction started: 28 October 2008
- Completed: April 2014 (shopping center)

Height
- Top floor: 74 m (243 ft)

Technical details
- Floor count: 18 (5 underground stories)

Design and construction
- Architects: Sead Gološ et al., Grupa Arh d.o.o.
- Main contractor: ANS Drive d.o.o.

Sarajevo City Center (SCC) is a business complex and shopping center in downtown Sarajevo, Bosnia and Herzegovina, that consists of three main parts: a shopping mall and leisure complex; a five star hotel tower; and a commercial offices tower, with a common 4-story underground parking area with more than 1100 parking spaces.

The building site is located in the Marijin Dvor neighborhood, close to the centers of public administration, as well historical (museums), educational (campus of the state university) and business (UNITIC, Avaz Twist Tower and similar). The public transportation in its vicinity enables access to the old town of the city in about five minutes.

The SCC Media facade, used for broadcasting advertising, the news, latest in sport, weather forecast, winning games, two-way communication, is the largest in the country and one of the largest video billboards in Europe.

With a total constructed area of 105,410 square meters (1,134,600 sq ft), it is one of the largest commercial business buildings in Bosnia and Herzegovina after completing in early 2014.

== Shopping mall and entertainment center ==
The shopping mall offers worldwide known brands in fashion, sports and technology. It is spread upon 49,500 square meters (533,000 sq ft) and contains around 80 shops. Turk Mall is in charge of space leasing and mall management.

The entertainment center is situated on the third (playland) and fourth floors (bowling, laser, bumper cars, children's playroom, simulator games, billiards), while more than 15 restaurants are present with more than 550 seats.

== Hotel ==
The Swissôtel Sarajevo has 218 rooms on 13,900 square meters (150,000 sq ft).

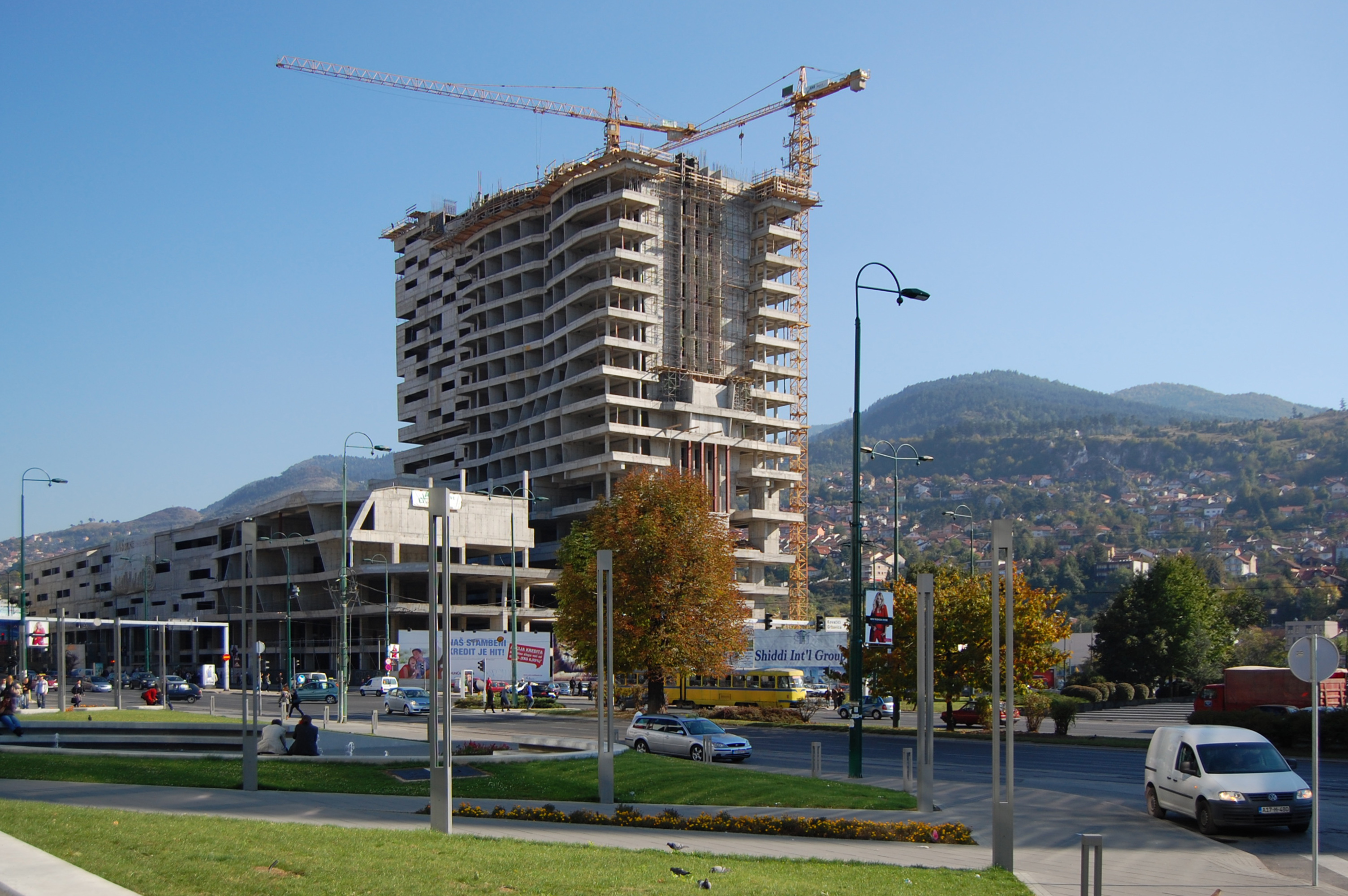
During construction in 2011

Shopping mall (during construction)

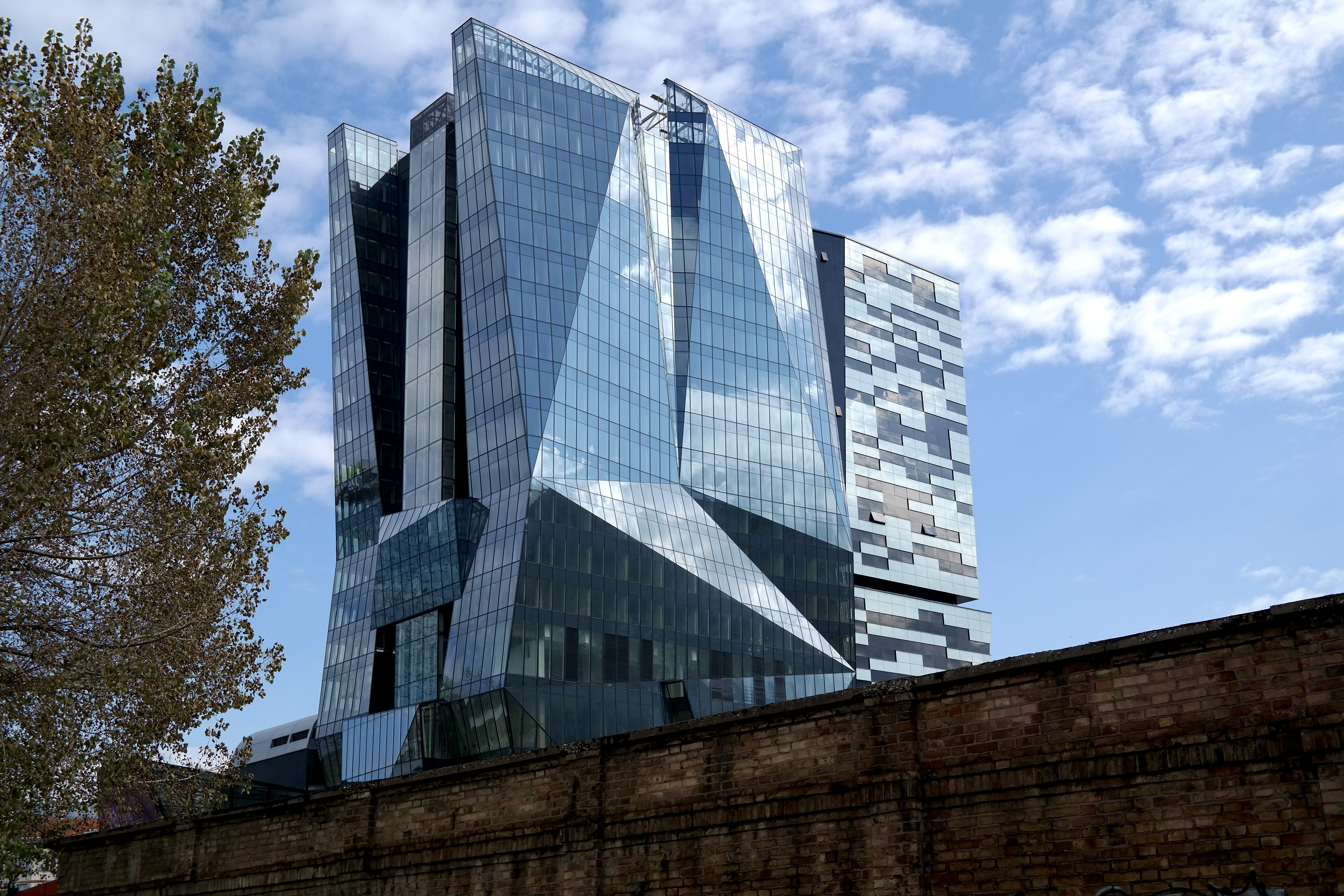
In September 2014

The complex in 2015
