= Faculty of Political Sciences in Sarajevo =

University faculty in Sarajevo, Bosnia and Herzegovina

- Fakultet političkih nauka u Sarajevu
- Seal of the Faculty of Political Sciences in Sarajevo
- Other names: FPN or FPN Sarajevo
- Former names: Visoka škola političkih nauka Sarajevo
- Type: Faculty
- Established: 1961
- Affiliations: University of Sarajevo
- Dean: Sead Turčalo
- Location: Sarajevo, Bosnia and Herzegovina
- Campus: Urban
- Colors: Turquoise

The Faculty of Political Sciences in Sarajevo (Bosnian: Fakultet političkih nauka u Sarajevu) or FPN is one of the 24 faculties of the University of Sarajevo, Bosnia and Herzegovina. The faculty was formed in 1961 as the former "High School (i.e. tertiary institution) of Political Sciences in Sarajevo" and is located in the urban area of Sarajevo (between Drvenija Bridge and Čobanija Bridge).

The Faculty of Political Sciences actively participates in the Bologna Process in Bosnia and Herzegovina, publishes scholarly papers, reviews articles, researches notes and book reviews covering major areas of political sciences, sociology, security studies, social work and media studies. The Sarajevo Social Science Review has been published by the faculty (formerly Godišnjak Fakulteta političkih nauka - Annual Papers of The Faculty of Political Sciences). There is also an FPN student newspaper called SPONA.

The faculty also participates in joint MA’s programs in political science in partnership with various regional and European universities.

== Organization ==
The Faculty of Political Sciences in Sarajevo has five departments and one institute:

- Department of Politology
- Department of Sociology
- Department of Communication studies (Journalism)
- Department of Social work
- Department of Security and Peace studies
- Institute of Social research

== Degree programs ==
The educational process at the Faculty of Political Sciences is carried out in three cycles of study:

- The Bachelor's program (BA) lasts three years carrying 180 ECTS credits
- The Master's program (MA) lasts two years carrying 120 ECTS credits
- The Doctoral program (PhD) lasts three years carrying 180 ECTS credits
