= Babića Bašća =

Neighborhood in Sarajevo Canton, Bosnia and Herzegovina

Babića Bašča Бабића Башча
- Neighborhood
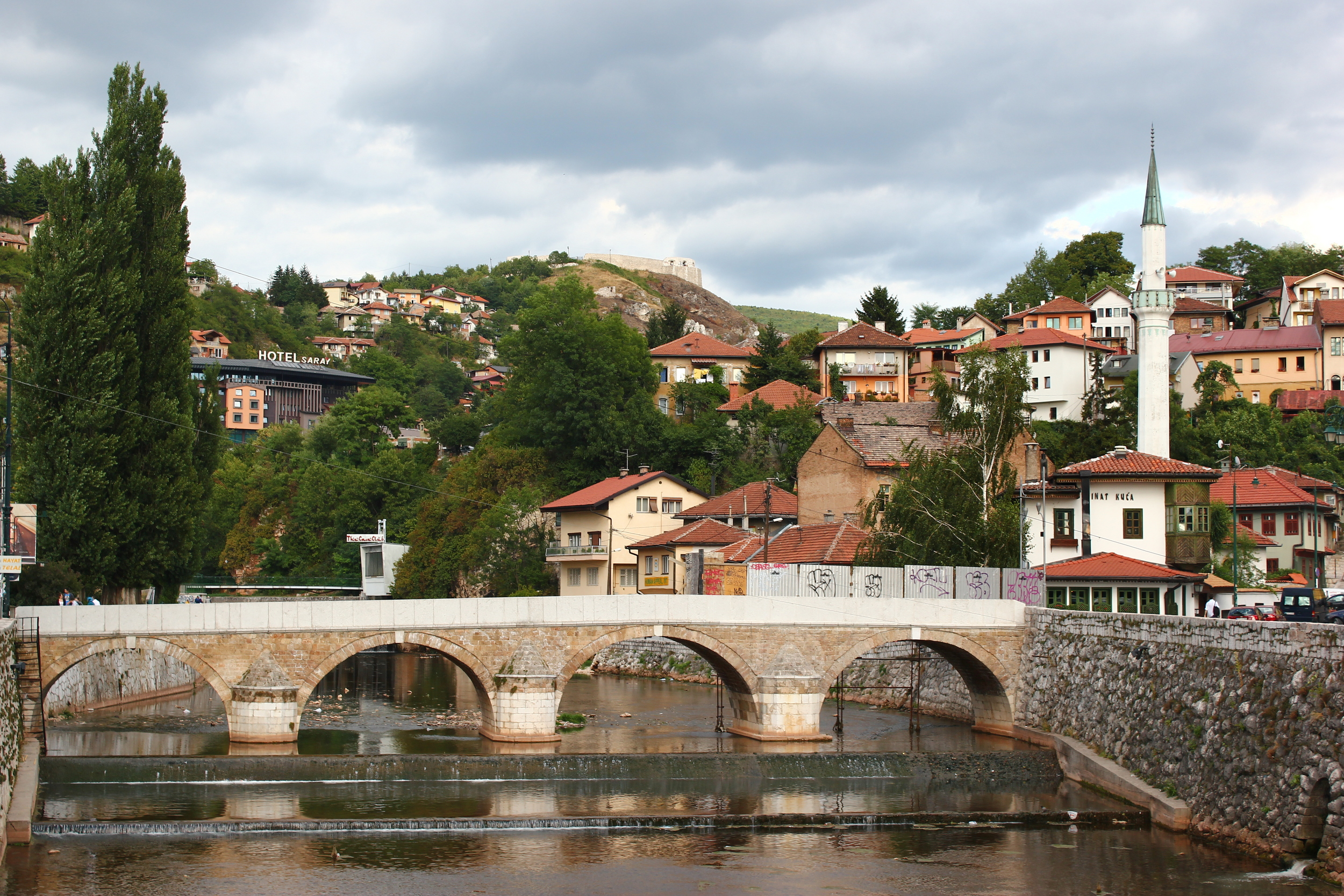
- The Babića Bašča local community, with Šeher-Ćehaja Bridge in front, Inat kuća just behind it, in front of the minaret which on the other hand belongs to the Vekil-Harač mosque. Cemetery Alifakovac can be seen on the right side in the background, while the fortress on the hill in background, left on the photo, is the Bijela Tabija.
- Nickname: Alifakovac (after the cemetery and street within the neighborhood)
- Interactive map of Babića Bašča
- Coordinates: 43°51′27.08″N 18°26′13.86″E
- Country: Bosnia and Herzegovina
- Entity: Federation of Bosnia and Herzegovina
- Canton: Sarajevo Canton
- Municipality: Stari Grad, Sarajevo
- Seat: Maguda br. 1

Government
  - President: Sead Durmo
  - Council of local community: Members: Dijana Simit-Brzić; Mirsada Šačić; Ademir Mulabdić; Muamer Popara

Population
  - Total: 1,496
- Time zone: UTC+1 (CET)
  - Summer (DST): UTC+2 (CEST)
- Postal code: 71000
- Area code: 033
- Website: Mjesna zajednica Babića Bašča - Stari Grad

Babića Bašča (Cyrillic: Бабића Башча, lit. "Babić's Garden") is a local community within the municipality of Stari Grad, Sarajevo. It's one of the oldest neighborhoods in the city of Sarajevo. It derives its name from a garden that was the property of a certain Babić family, and it was located in a street that now has the same name as the local community. The reason why it's named after a garden is that because almost all houses had gardens in their courtyards and in summer, many people who traveled through Sarajevo in the past, described Sarajevo as a green oasis surrounded by hills, making those gardens something as a symbol of the city. The street and old cemetery Alifakovac is located here and therefore the neighborhood is locally and throughout the city known as Alifakovac. It borders the local communities of Baščaršija, Vratnik and Mošćanica to the north, Hrid – Jarčedoli to the south, Bistrik to the west and the Entity of Republika Srpska to the east. The local community counts a population of 1,496.

== Landmarks ==
There are many buildings and landmarks to be seen in this local community as it is one of the oldest neighborhoods in the city. Some of the more important include:

- Mosque Vekil-Harač or The Pilgrim mosque is a mosque on the banks of the river Miljacka, in the street Veliki Alifakovac (Big Alifakovac). It was built either in 1541 or in 1561 by the quartermaster of Gazi Husrev-beg. It derives its nickname from the fact that in the past the pilgrimages from Sarajevo started their journey to Mekka to attend the Hajj from this place.
- Mosque Čeljigovići is a mosque located in the Čeljigovići street, just beneath Tranzit istok. It has a tin roof and in 1562 on its place was a mosque of Janissary Nezir. In 1781 it was thoroughly renewed and a maktab was built beside it.
- Havadže-zade Ahmed mosque known also as Podtakišom, built in 1565, located beneath Tranzit istok on a crossroad.
- Jakub-pašina mosque, located in Megara street (also known as Small Alifakovac), built in 1491, destroyed in 1936 and reconstructed again in September 2008.
- Cemetery Alifakovac, created in the 15th century, is a cemetery which was declared as a national monument in 2005 and was renewed in 2007.
- Goat's Bridge is located in the canyon of the river Miljacka, couple of kilometers east from the old part of the city. It was part of the old Tsargrad road which connected Sarajevo to the east part of the Ottoman Empire and to the city of Tsargrad (nowadays Istanbul) itself. It is one of the four old bridges in the city which are still preserved. It is 42 meters long and 4,75 meters width, with the arch spanning 17.5 meters. It is a national monument.
- Inat kuća (Spite house) is a house just on banks on the south side of the river Miljacka on the east entrance of the city. It was built on the north side of Miljacka, on the place where now the City hall is located. But in 1892–1894, in the time when the Austria-Hungarian government decided to build a City hall there, it was necessary for the house to be removed from that place. All other buildings were easily removed, but the owner of this particular house requested a sack of ducat and his house to be transferred, block by block, on the other side of the river. After it was done, because of the spite of the owner the house got the name it has now. Today, it is a restaurant which serves traditional Bosnian meals.
- Šeher-Ćehaja Bridge is the first bridge on the east enter in the city of Sarajevo. Little is known about its construction. It is speculated if the bridge was built in 1585 or in 1620. There is also another historical name for the bridge, "Mustafa-paša's bridge", which is mentioned in a Sarajevo newspaper from 1881. It is a national monument.
- Drinking fountain on Alifakovac, a protected monument.

== Streets ==
The neighborhood consists of 23 streets: Alifakovac, Avdage Šahinagića, Alije Bejtića, Babića Bašča, Braće Morić, Čeljigovići, Džemala Čelića, Franjevačka, Hafiza-Ibrahima Trebinjca, Hošin brijeg, Lapišnica, Maguda, Maguda čikma, Megara (Mali Alifakovac), Megara čikma, Mehmeda Mujezinovića, Muje Hrnjice, Podcarina, Šeher-Ćehajina čikma, Timurhanova, Toplik, Turbe and Veliki Alifakovac.
