= Mokranjska Miljacka wellspring cave =

Cave near the village of Mokro, Bosnia and Herzegovina

- Pećina izvor Mokranjske Miljacke
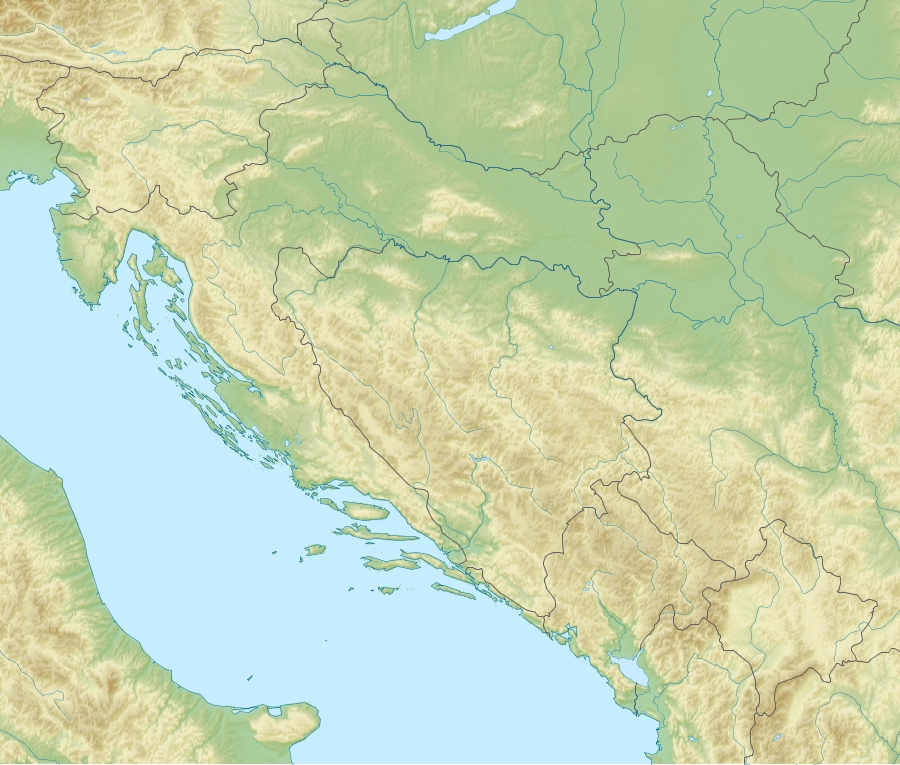
- Location within Bosnia and Herzegovina Location within Dinaric Alps
- Location: Kadino Selo near Mokro, Bosnia and Herzegovina
- Coordinates: 43.924791°N 18.595741°E
- Length: 7.2 kilometres (4.5 mi)
- Geology: Karst cave
- Show cave opened: No
- Features: Subterranean river, underground lake
- Website: www.centarzakrs.ba

Mokranjska Miljacka wellspring cave is the source of Mokranjska Miljacka, located about 7 kilometres (4.3 mi) from the village of Mokro, near Pale. The cave is officially the longest in Bosnia and Herzegovina, with length of mapped caverns so far at 7.2 kilometres (4.5 mi), as of August 2015. The Miljacka runs out of the cave practically as an underground flow, a subterranean river, where its temperature is measured as low as 5 degrees and temperature of air as low as 8 degrees Celsius.

The exact location of the cave is not yet mapped out for the public, but local authorities have released a map which can be used to find its location as well as a gallery of discoveries within the cave.

New species of spiders, named Nemanela Lade ("Lada's Little Monster", namesake of its discoverer PhD Lada Lukić-Bilela from Institute for Genetic Technology, Sarajevo), along with at least five more species of spider, as well as certain species of bats, have been found there. A skeleton head of a cave bear has also been found at the location. Paleontological finds, traces of human habitation, stalactites and stalagmites, as well as pisolite rocks, the river Miljacka wellspring, all makes this cave among most valuable speleological objects in Bosnia and Herzegovina. Researchers believe to have discovered bubbles of air, a possible sign of tectonic activity.

== Also see ==
- List of longest Dinaric caves
- Miljacka
