= Academy of Fine Arts Sarajevo =

Art school in Bosnia and Herzegovina

Coordinates: 43°51′21.6″N 18°25′4.44″E

- Akademija likovnih umjetnosti Sarajevo; Академија ликовних умјетности Сарајево
- Type: Faculty
- Established: 1972; 54 years ago
- Religious affiliation: not determinated (any or none)
- Academic affiliations: University of Sarajevo
- Dean: Dubravka Pozderac-Lejlić
- Administrative staff: 9
- Students: 2,666
- Undergraduates: 1,212 (as of May 2012)
- Location: Obala Maka Dizdara 3, Sarajevo, 71000, Bosnia and Herzegovina
- Campus: Urban
- Language: Bosnian/Croatian/Serbian
- Website: www.alu.unsa.ba

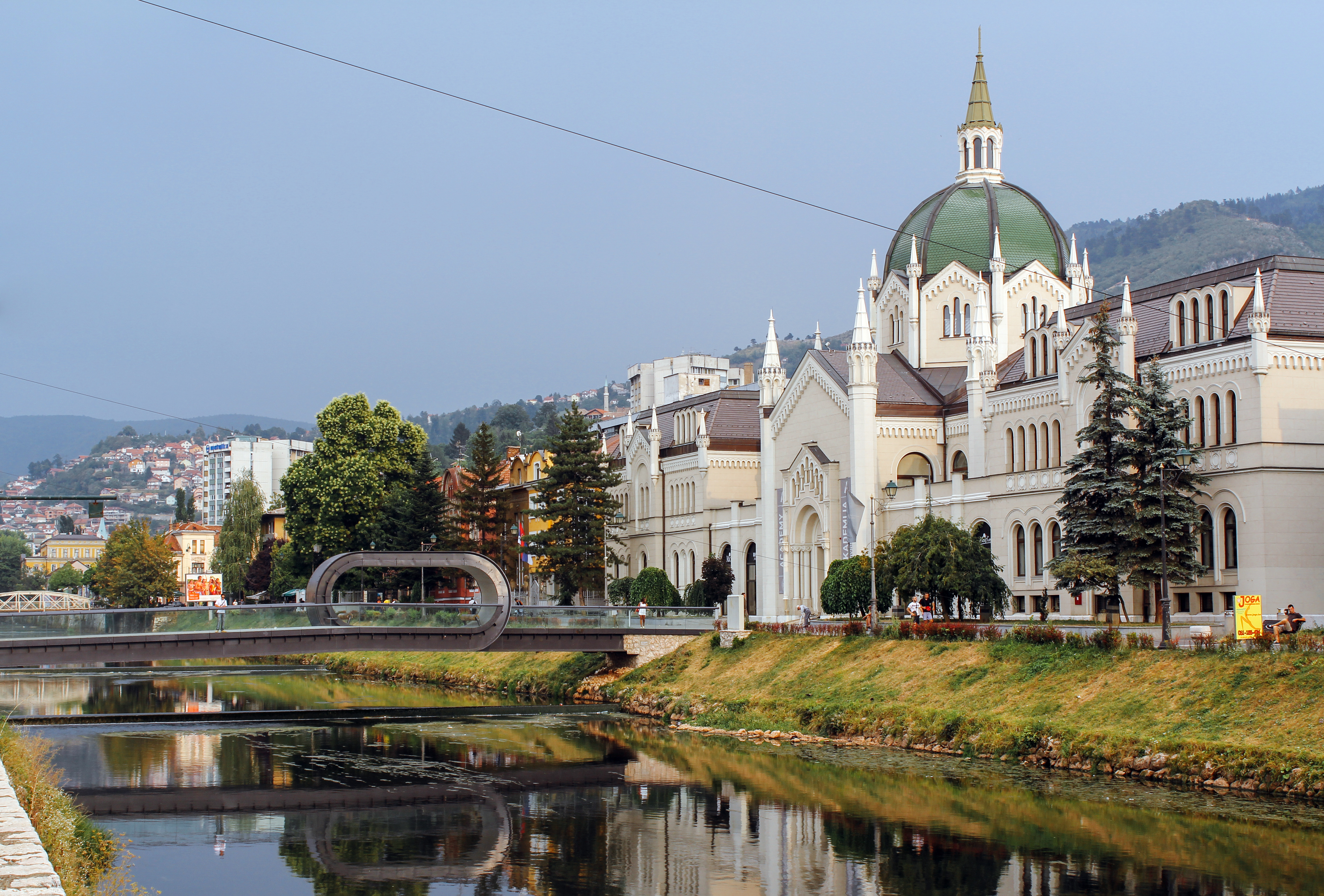
The Academy of Fine Arts in 2013

The Academy of Fine Arts Sarajevo (Bosnian: Akademija likovnih umjetnosti Sarajevo / Академија ликовних умјетности Сарајево, acronym: ALU) is a faculty within the University of Sarajevo in Sarajevo, Bosnia and Herzegovina, dedicated to the fine arts.

It was established in 1972 as an institution of higher education by eminent professors, scientists, and acclaimed artists who were educated primarily in Belgrade, Ljubljana, and Zagreb.

== History ==
The then-newly established Academy of Fine Arts Sarajevo was first located in the building of the Pedagogical Academy in Sarajevo. At the same time, the home of today's ALU was the first and only Protestant church constructed in the times of the Austro-Hungarian occupation of BiH.

The church was built in 1899 and designed by the architect Karlo Paržik in a Romanesque-Byzantine style. The building was devastated in early 1992 at the start of the Bosnian War. The church was proclaimed a cultural-historical monument and is therefore included on the list of protected buildings by the Institute for the Protection of Cultural-Historical and Natural Heritage.

Muhamed Karamehmedović (an art historian and the first dean of ALU), Nada Pivac (an academic painter), Mersad Berber (an academic painter), Boro Aleksić (another academic painter), Alija Kučukalić (an academic sculptor), and Zdenko Grgić (another academic sculptor) are some of the famous professors and founders of the Academy of Fine Arts Sarajevo.

As of December 2019, the academy has had 2,666 enrolled students since its establishment; by May 2012, it had recorded 1,212 graduates for undergraduate study. Postgraduate studies were introduced in 1983. There are 237 Masters students (M. A. degree).

The academy houses six departments that offer a multitude of courses:

1. Department of Art Education
2. Department of Painting
3. Department of Sculpting
4. Department of Printmaking
5. Department of Graphic Design
6. Department of Product Design

The Academy of Fine Arts Sarajevo introduced the Bologna educational system (4+1) in the 2006/07 school year.

In front of the building itself, there is a pedestrian bridge that connects Radić Street with the academy. The bridge on the Miljacka river bears the phrase "Festina lente" (meaning "make haste slowly" in Latin). The 38 meter structure cost about 2 million KM, and was based on conceptual ideas and preliminary design by then students in their second year of Product Design at ALU: Amila Hrustić, Adnan Alagić and Bojan Kanlić.

== Gallery ==
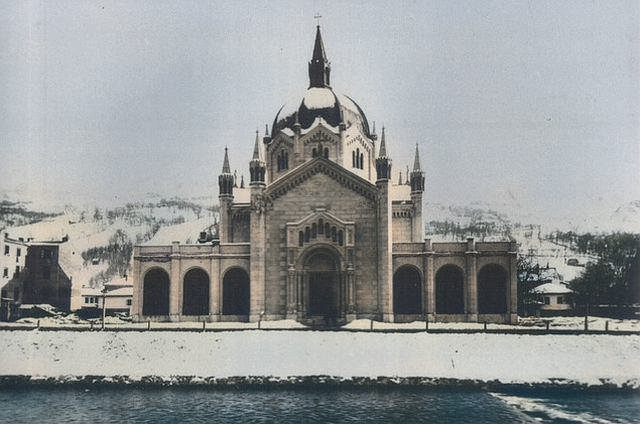
ALU in 1900

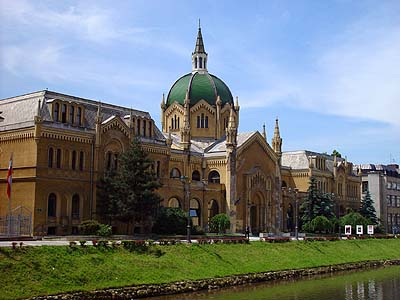
ALU before sanation

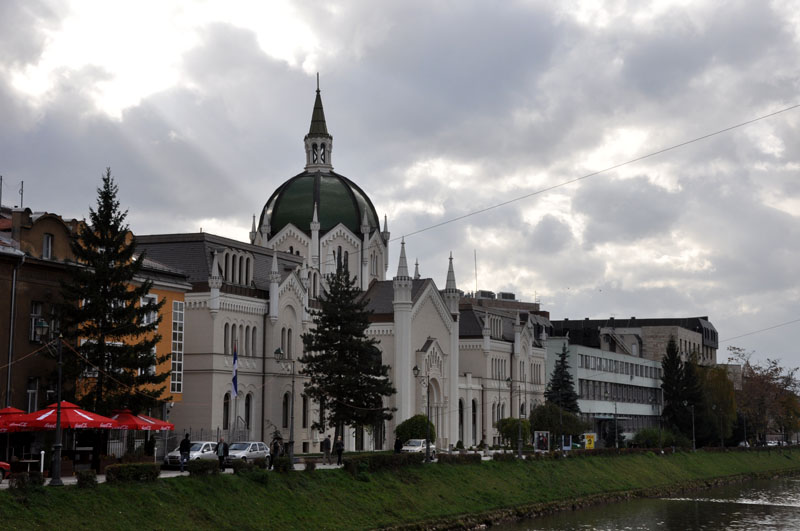
ALU after sanation

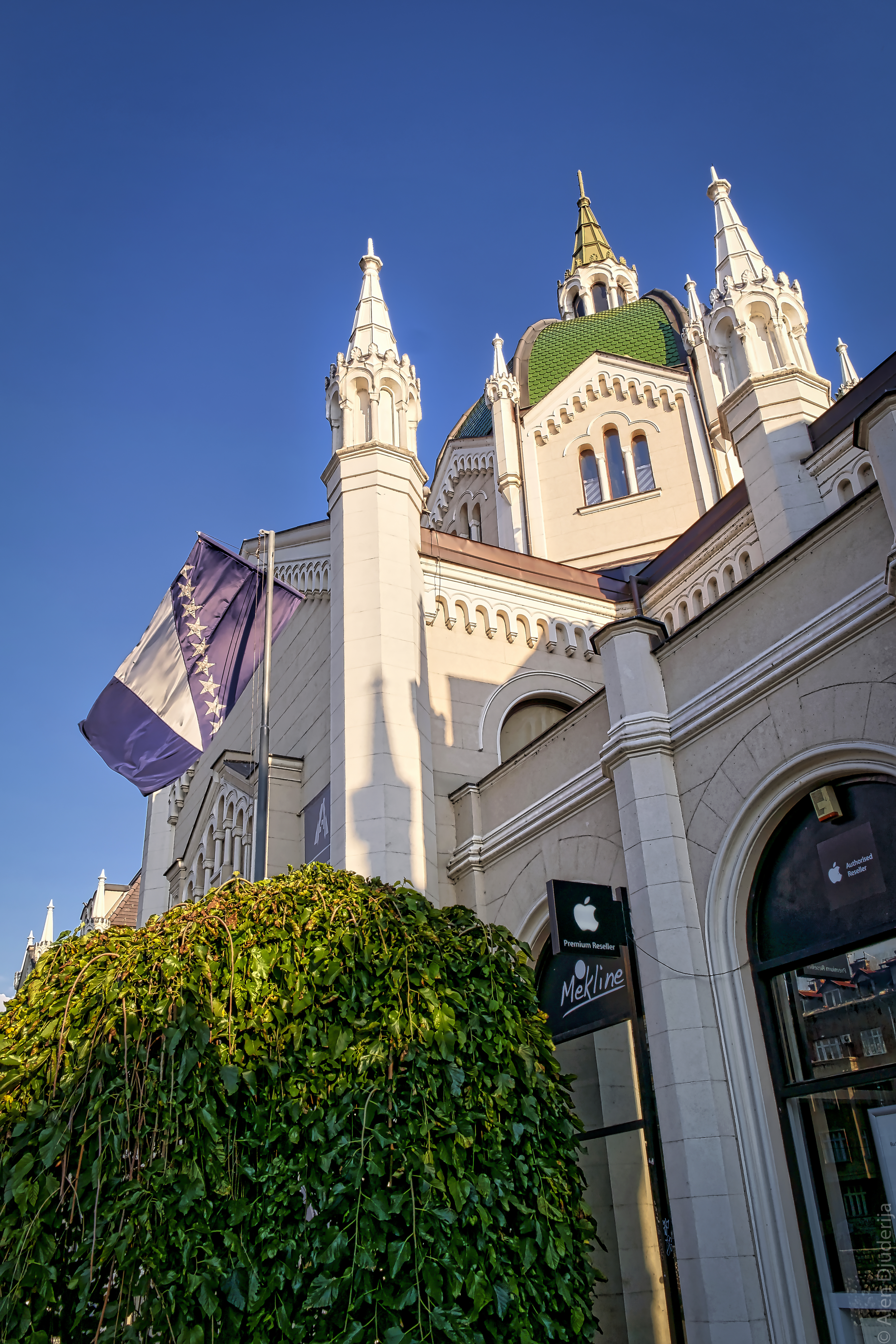
ALU

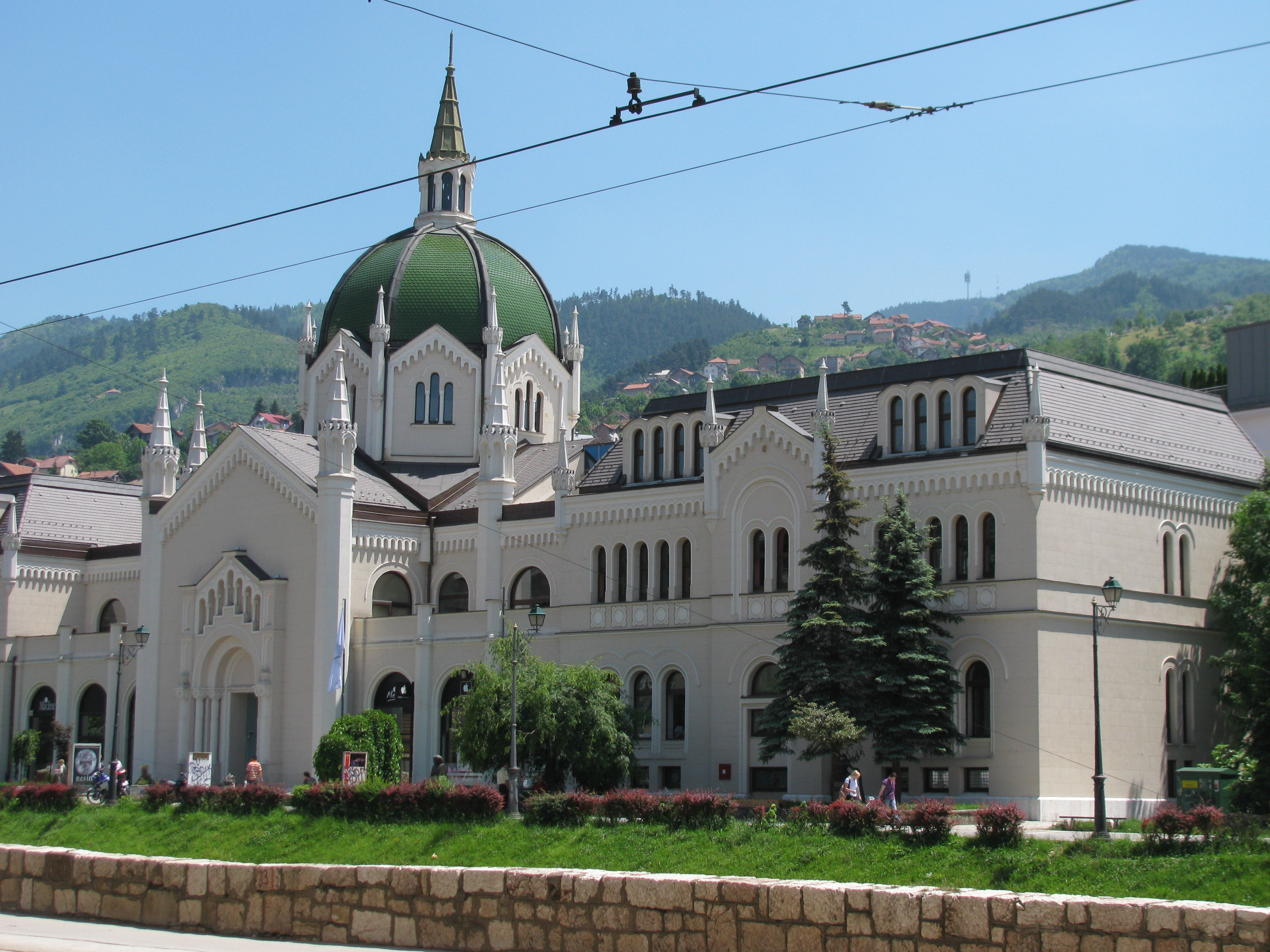
ALU in spring

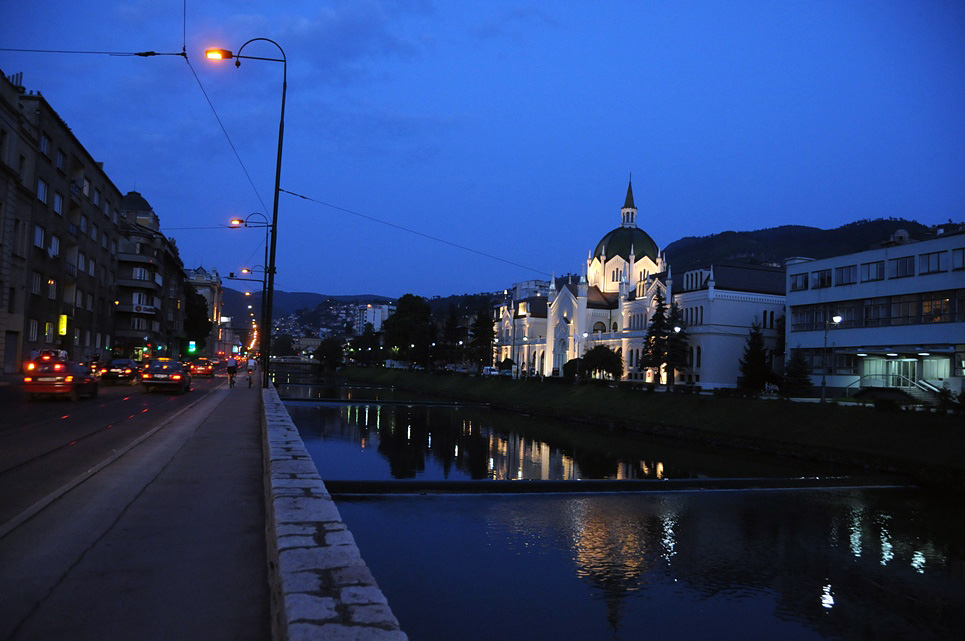
ALU at night, 2009

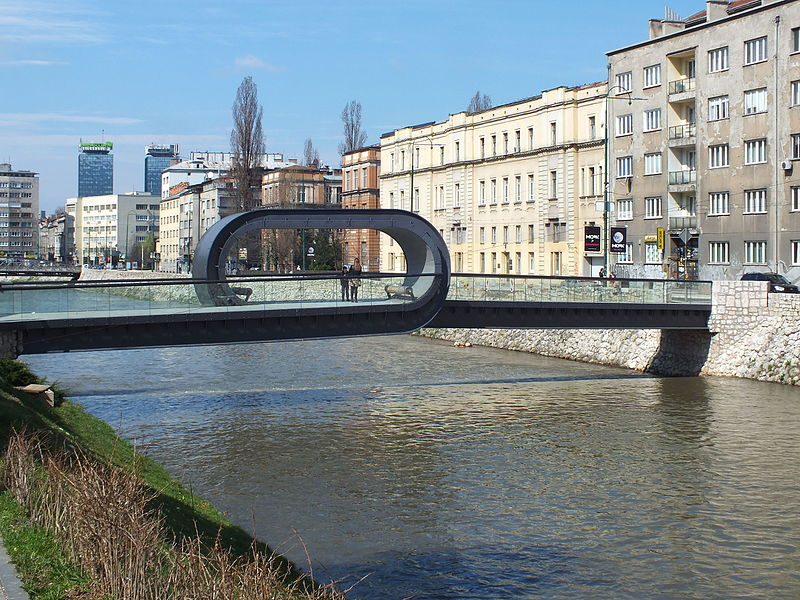
Bridge "Festina lente" in front of ALU

== Notable alumni ==
- Damir Nikšić (painting, 2000)
- Gabrijel Jurkić
- Šejla Kamerić (graphic arts)
- Mladen Kolobarić (Head of the Graphic Department 1974-2004)
