= Goat's Bridge =

Ottoman stone-arch bridge over Miljacka in Sarajevo, Bosnia and Herzegovina

Goat's bridge Kozija ćuprija
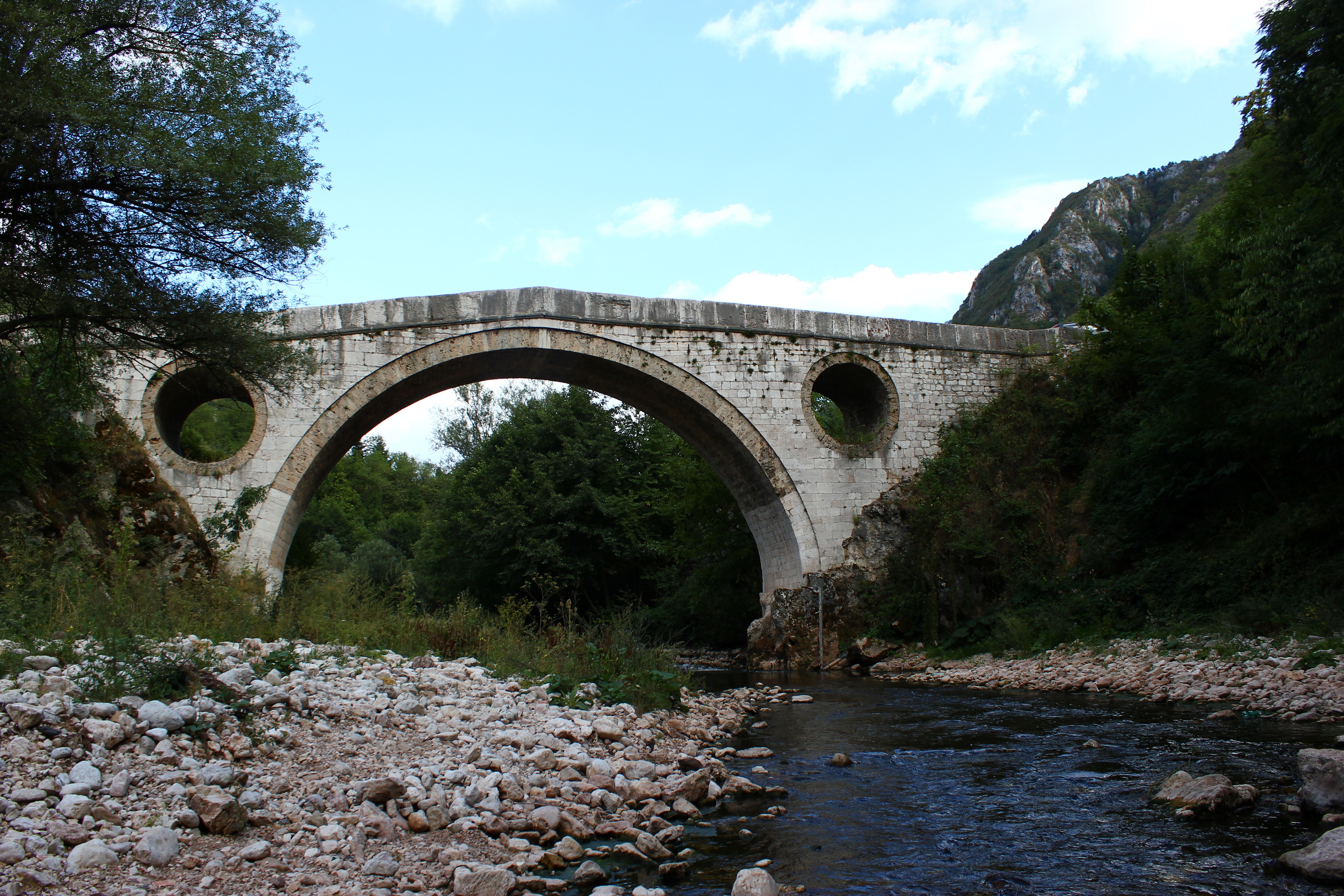
- Goat's Bridge
- Coordinates: 43°51′13″N 18°27′26″E
- Carries: Pedestrians and bicycles
- Crosses: Miljacka

Characteristics
- Material: Limestone, mortar

Location
- Interactive map of Goat's bridge

The Goat's Bridge (Bosnian, Croatian and Serbian: Kozija ćuprija / Козја ћуприја) is a large stone bridge that crosses the Miljacka river to the east of Sarajevo downtown. It is located in Babića Bašća neighborhood (local community), in the Municipality of Stari Grad, Bosnia and Herzegovina.

== History ==
It was built by the Ottomans in the 16th century. It is the only fully preserved bridge from the Ottoman period which still spans the Miljacka River. The bridge, which is made primarily of white hreša (marble), is a harmonious structure with one main arch and two round openings which help support the weight. This stone material is also used to build Bijela Tabija fortress and Visegrad Gate of the nearby Vratnik fortified town.

The oldest written record of this bridge was made by Mula Mustafa Bašeškija, who noted in 1771 that a stone wall was built from Kozija Ćuprija all the way to Alifakovac.

=== Dariva ===
One of the attractions in Stari Grad is 8 km long walkway between Bentbaša and Kozija Ćuprija called Dariva. Its stretches along the Miljacka river, through the rugged Miljacka Canyon.

== National monument ==
The bridge is inscribed into the List of National Monuments of Bosnia and Herzegovina by KONS.
