= Careva Ćuprija =

Careva Ćuprija may refer to:

- Careva Ćuprija, Belgrade, a neighbourhood of the capital of Serbia
- Belgrade Hippodrome, a race track and concert venue in the neighbourhood
- Emperor's Bridge, a bridge in Sarajevo, Bosnia
- Careva Ćuprija, Olovo, a village near Olovo, Bosnia and Herzegovina
- Careva Ćuprija Stadium, a football stadium of FK BASK at Savski Venac, Belgrade
