= Alifakovac =

Coordinates: 43.857523°N 18.437183°E

Alifakovac Алифаковац
- Neighbourhood
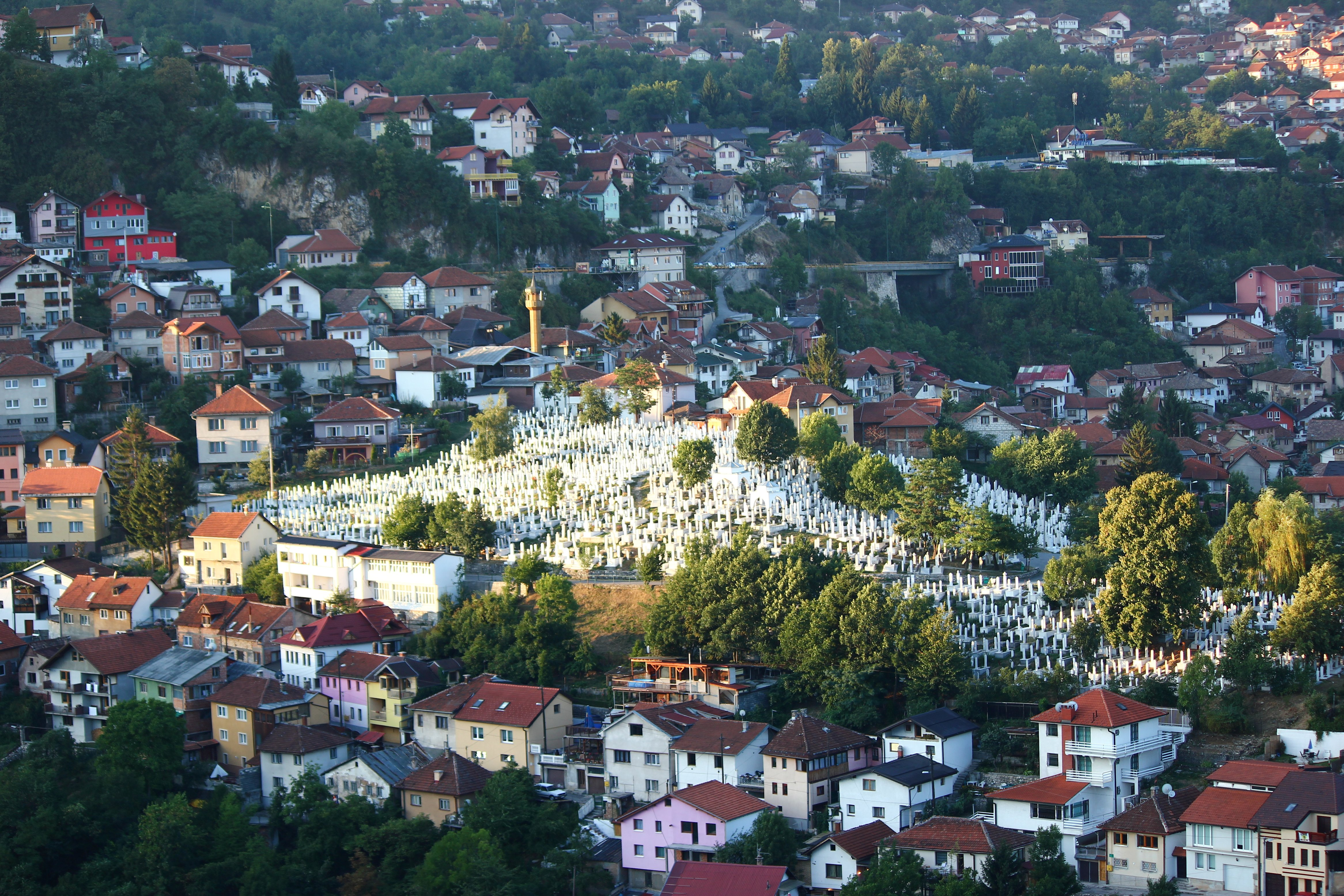
- Alifakovac with its cemetery
- Interactive map of Alifakovac
- Country: Bosnia
- Entity: Federation of Bosnia and Herzegovina
- Time zone: UTC+1 (CET)
  - Summer (DST): UTC+2 (CEST)

Alifakovac (Cyrillic: Алифаковац) is a neighbourhood in Babića bašća local community, municipality of Stari Grad, Sarajevo. As one of the oldest urban settlements in Sarajevo, it is situated on the spine of the northern end of the slope Trebević, on the lowest hill in the row at the last meander of Miljacka, before it pours out of its narrow canyon. An abandoned village by the road was found in the 15th century by the Ottomans when they conquered Bosnia. It is believed that there was a smaller necropolis of stećci, which with the arrival of Ottomans became again an active cemetery. Today it is one of the biggest and most beautiful cemeteries in Sarajevo.

== History ==
Alifakovac is as old as the modern city of Sarajevo, as it got its name after Ali-Fakih, a lawyer and one of the witnesses of Isa-bey's endowment of the city in 1462 which set the foundation for the city. Even in those times, the road was very frequent, which can be seen in the cemetery as aside of local peoples, it is the final place of many travellers and emigrants who died in Sarajevo, but also of officers, ulama and ordinary citizens. Jakub-paša decided to build a mosque near the cemetery in 1491, after which completion the streets Veliki (big) Alifakovac, Mali (small) Alifakovac, Megara, Magoda and Carina were established, giving birth to the neighbourhood. In the mid-16th century, at the bottom of Alifakovac, Gazi Husrev-beg's quartermaster Mustafa Vekil-Harač, built a mosque which would be soon known as the Pilgrim mosque as most pilgrims started their journey to Hajj from that place and around the same time, some mayor of Sarajevo connected the old Tsargrad road with Baščaršija square with a stone bridge which is nowadays known as Šeher-Ćehajina ćuprija, with which construction the modern landscape of Alifakovac was almost finalized.

The last touch on the urban landscape was given with the Inat kuća, which found itself a place on the south bank of the river with the construction of City hall just across the river, when the owner of the house requested for the house to be transported, stone by stone, on the other side of the river, where it stands even today.

Alifakovac is an example of construction based on humanity and mutual respect. The neighbours were not allowed to build houses the way to block the view and the sunlight for the neighbour, which allowed the roofs to elude below each other in rows and thus draw up one of the most beautiful monuments of old Sarajevo.
