= Skenderija Bridge =

Bridge over Miljacka in Sarajevo, Bosnia and Herzegovina

Coordinates: 43.8564°N 18.4132°E

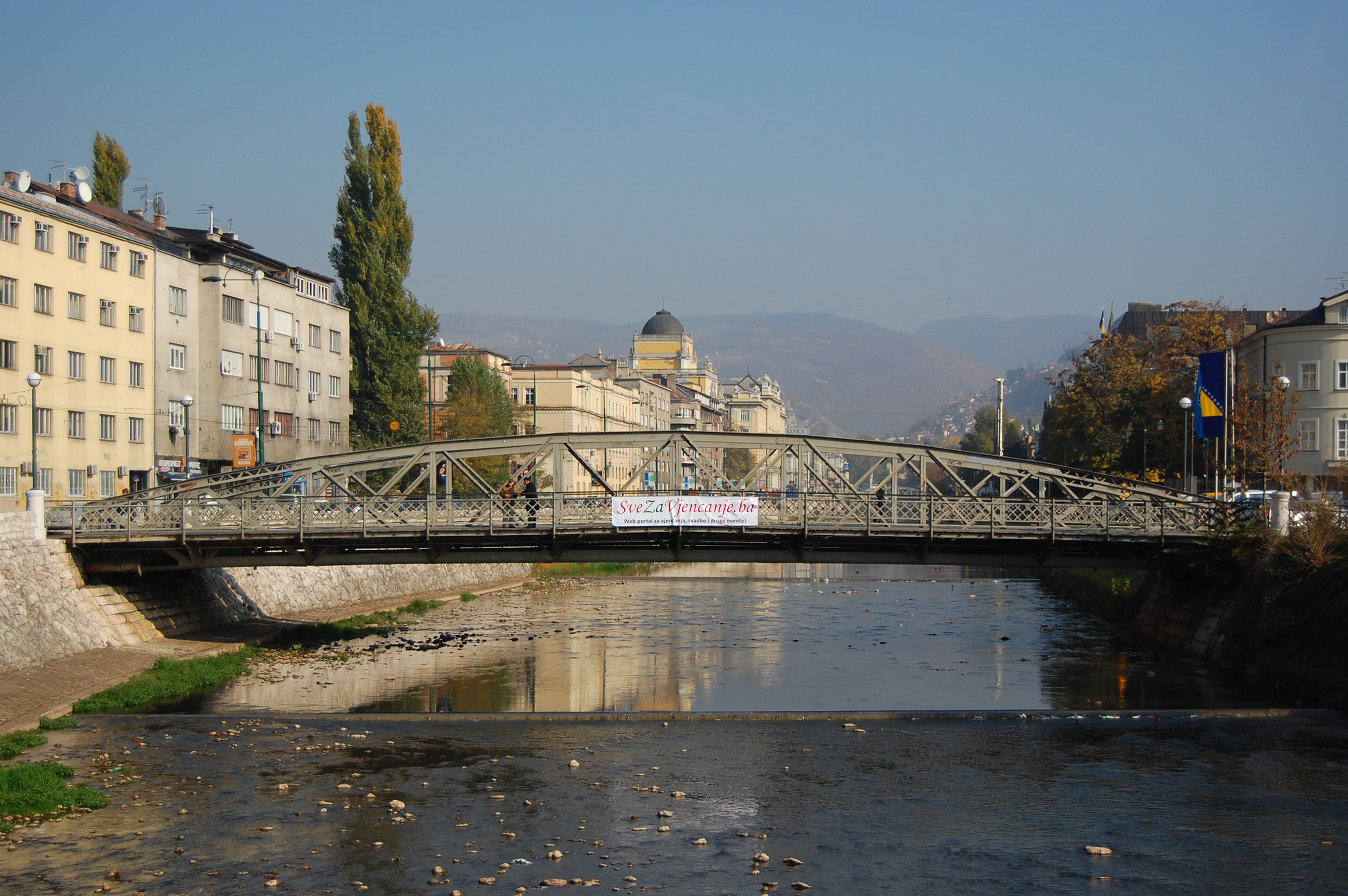
Skenderija bridge

The Skenderija Bridge (also called Ajfel or Ajfelov most) is a footbridge located in Sarajevo, Bosnia and Herzegovina opposite the Skenderija Centre which crosses the River Miljacka. It was designed by Gustave Eiffel. The bridge is home to a small number of love locks, a phenomenon practiced by lovers on various European, Asian and Australian bridges.

Somewhere near the bridge's current location, the Ottoman governor, Skender Pasha, had a wooden bridge erected at the end of the 15th or beginning of the 16th century. The neighborhood of Skenderija on the left bank of the Miljacka is named after him.
