= Festina lente (bridge) =

Bridge over Miljacka in Sarajevo, Bosnia and Herzegovina

Coordinates: 43.8563°N 18.4176°E

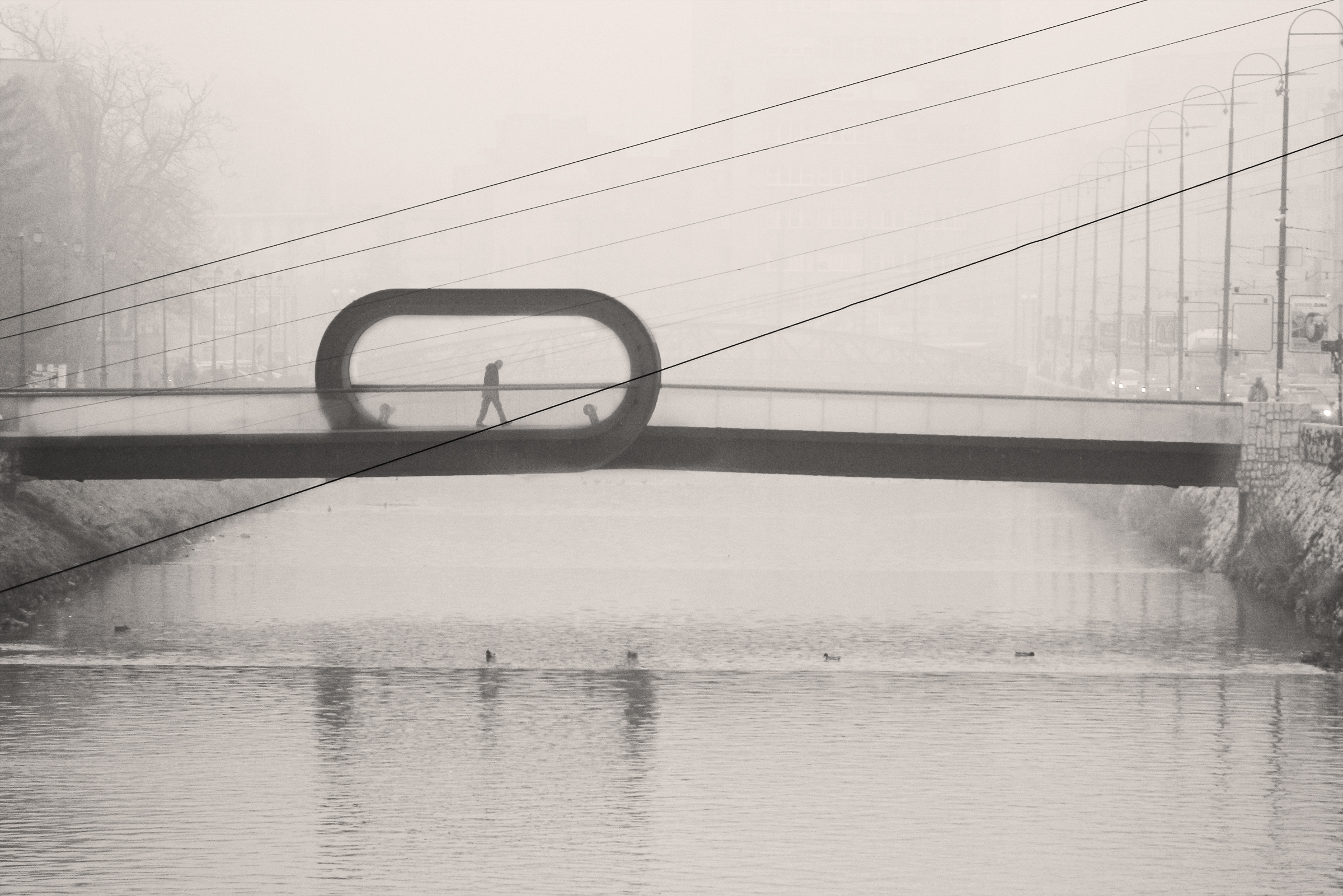
Festina lente Bridge in December 2015

Festina lente (Latin for "make haste slowly") is a pedestrian bridge over the Miljacka River in Sarajevo. The bridge is 38 meters long and features an unusual looping in the middle, suggesting slowing down and enjoying the view. Conceptual design for the bridge was created by three students of the Academy of Fine Arts in Sarajevo: Adnan Alagić, Amila Hrustić and Bojana Kanlić. The bridge connects the Mak Dizdar embankment (close to the Academy) with Radićeva street. It was officially opened on 22 August 2012.

== See also ==
- Festina lente — Latin saying meaning "make haste slowly"
