= Emperor's Mosque =

Mosque in Sarajevo, Bosnia and Herzegovina

- Careva džamija Царева џамија
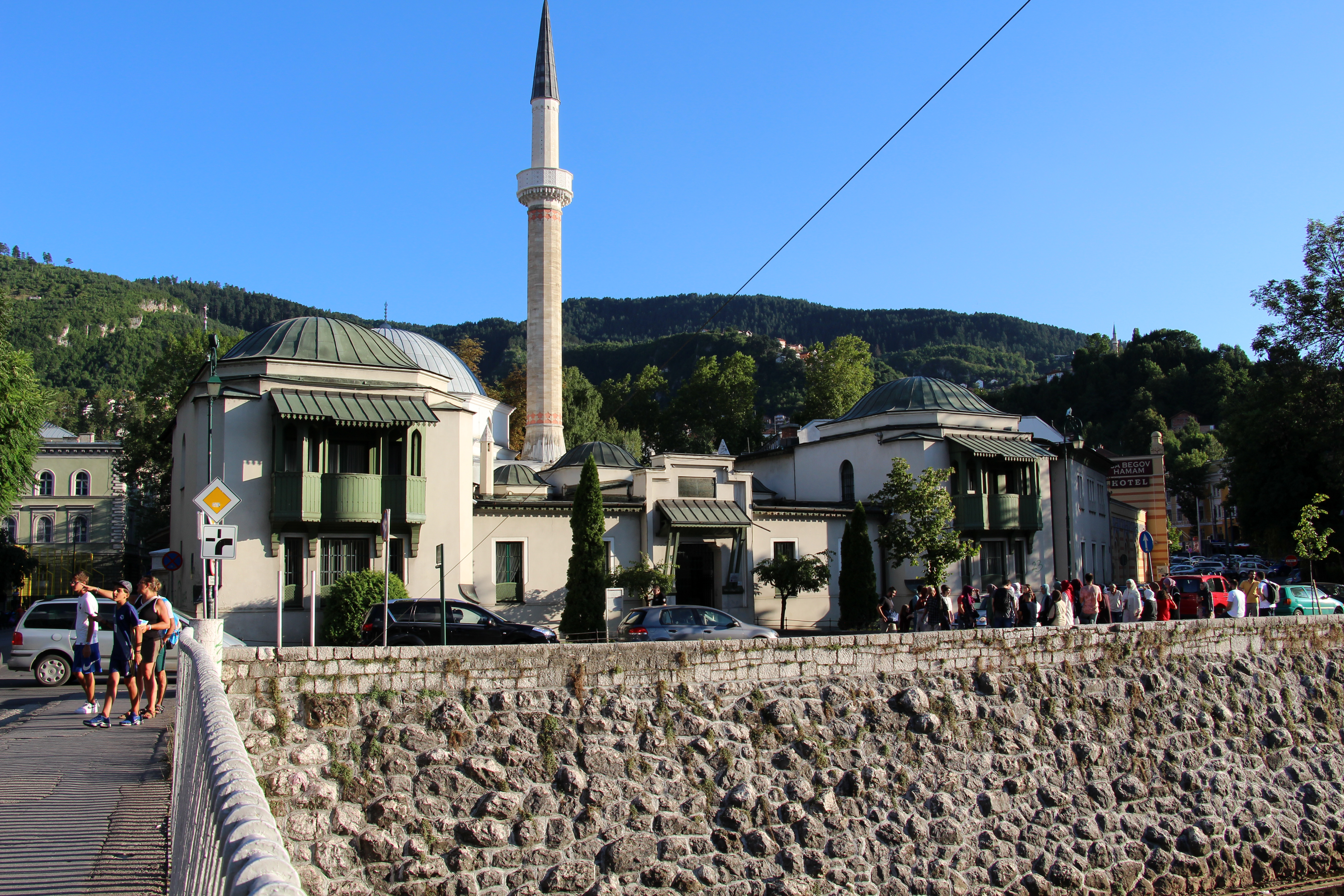
- A view of the mosque from the Emperor's Bridge

- Location of the former mosque in Sarajevo

Religion
- Affiliation: Sunni Islam
- Ecclesiastical or organisational status: Mosque
- Status: Active

Location
- Location: Sarajevo
- Country: Bosnia and Herzegovina
- Interactive map of Emperor's Mosque
- Coordinates: 43°51′27″N 18°25′49″E

Architecture
- Type: Mosque
- Style: Ottoman
- Founder: Isaković-Hranušić
- Completed: 1457 (original); 1565 (rebuilt); 2020 (renovations)

Specifications
- Capacity: 500 worshipers
- Dome: 1
- Minaret: 1

Website
- www.emperorsmosque.org

The Emperor's Mosque (Bosnian: Careva džamija; Serbian: Царева џамија; Turkish: Hünkâr Camii) is a mosque in Sarajevo, Bosnia and Herzegovina. Completed in 1457 CE, it was the first mosque built after the Ottoman conquest of Bosnia. Built in the classical Ottoman style, it is the largest single-subdome mosque in the country.

It was built by Isaković-Hranušić who dedicated it to the Sultan, Mehmed the Conqueror, the conqueror of Constantinople. Considered one of the most beautiful mosques of the Ottoman period in the Balkans, the mosque features a roomy interior and high quality decorative details, such as the mihrab.

== History ==
The original mosque was built in the mid-15th century. Damaged and totally destroyed by the end of that century, it was rebuilt in 1565 and dedicated this time to Suleiman the Magnificent.

The first mosque was made of wood and significantly smaller than the existing building that was built in 1565. Side rooms were added in 1800 and connected to the central prayer area in 1848. Between 1980 and 1983, the painted decorations in the interior of the mosque were conserved and restored. The burial ground (graveyard) beside the Emperor's Mosque contains the graves of viziers, mullahs, imams, muftis, sheikhs, the employees in the Emperor's Mosque, along with other prominent figures living in Sarajevo.

The mosque was damaged during World War II but mostly in the wars during the 1990s, and renovation work was completed in 2020.

The first settlements in Sarajevo were built around the mosque with the residence of the Sultan's representatives then being built next to the mosque. Isa-bey also built a hamam (public bathhouse) and a bridge that led directly to the mosque. This bridge was disassembled during the Austro-Hungarian government and rebuilt just a few meters upstream where it still exists today, as the Emperor's Bridge.

On the other side of the river, he built a caravanserai. For the financing of these facilities, Isa-bey left a heritage of many shops, land and properties.

== Gallery ==
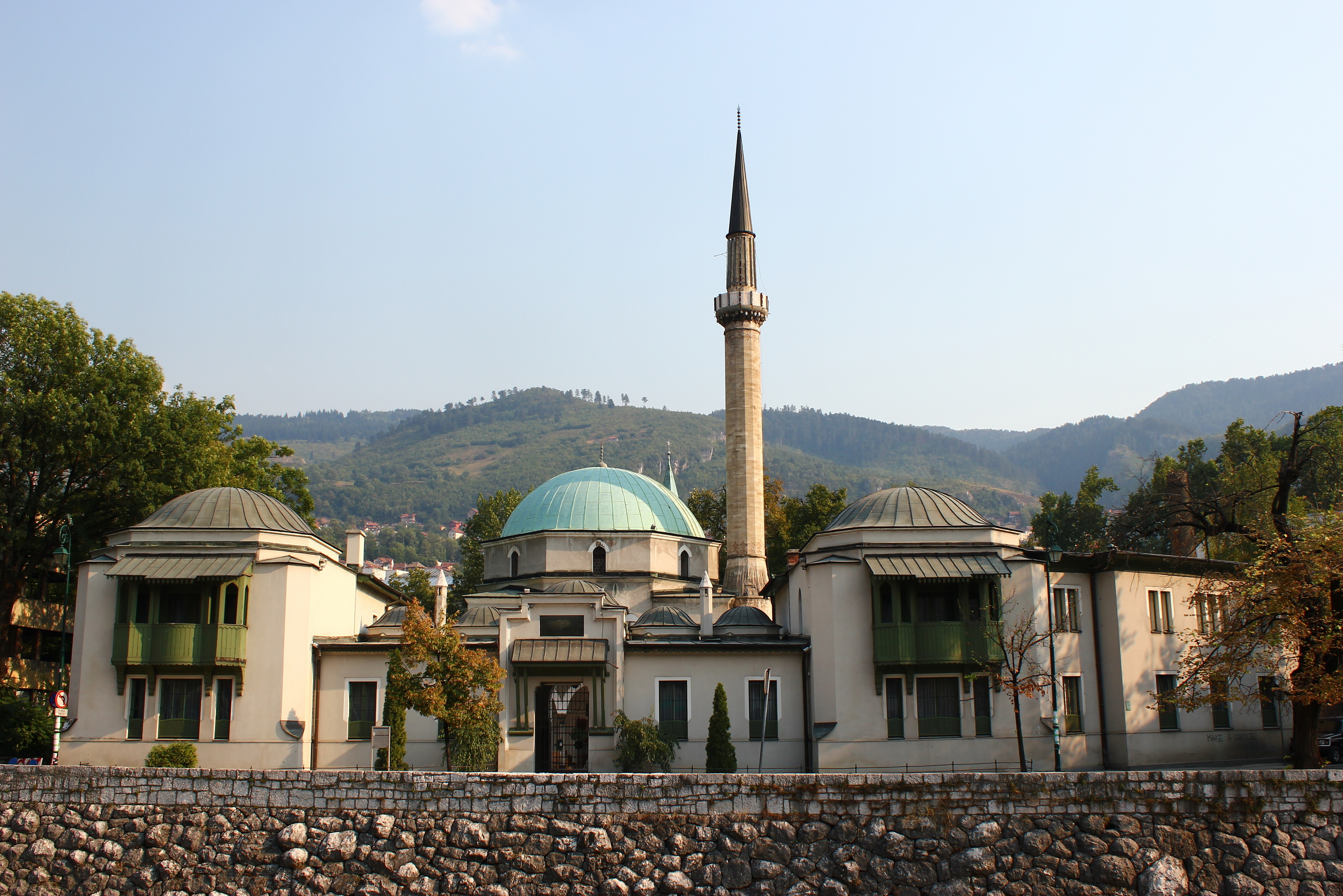
The mosque before the 2020 renovations

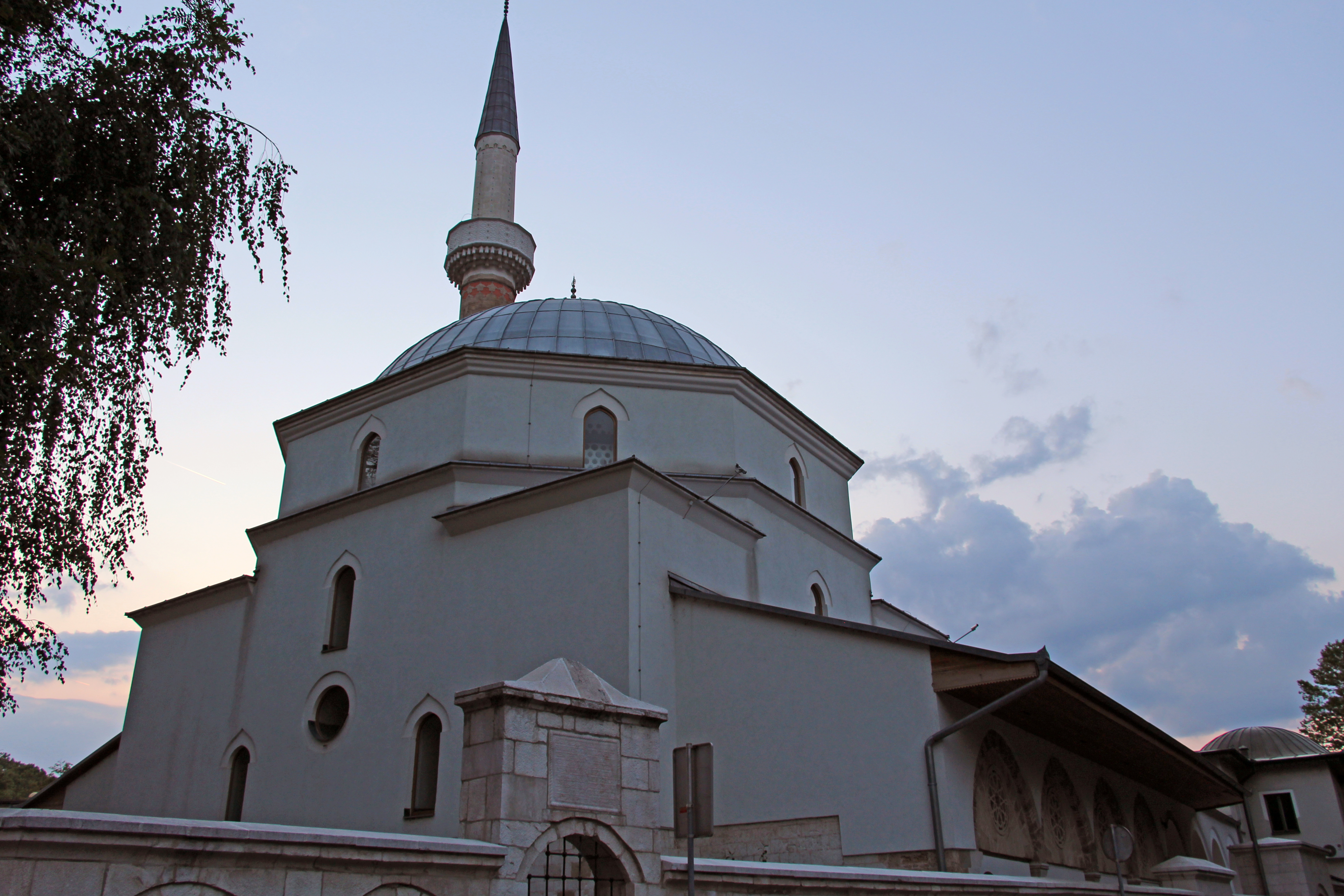
The main building, dome and minaret from Konak street, after 2020

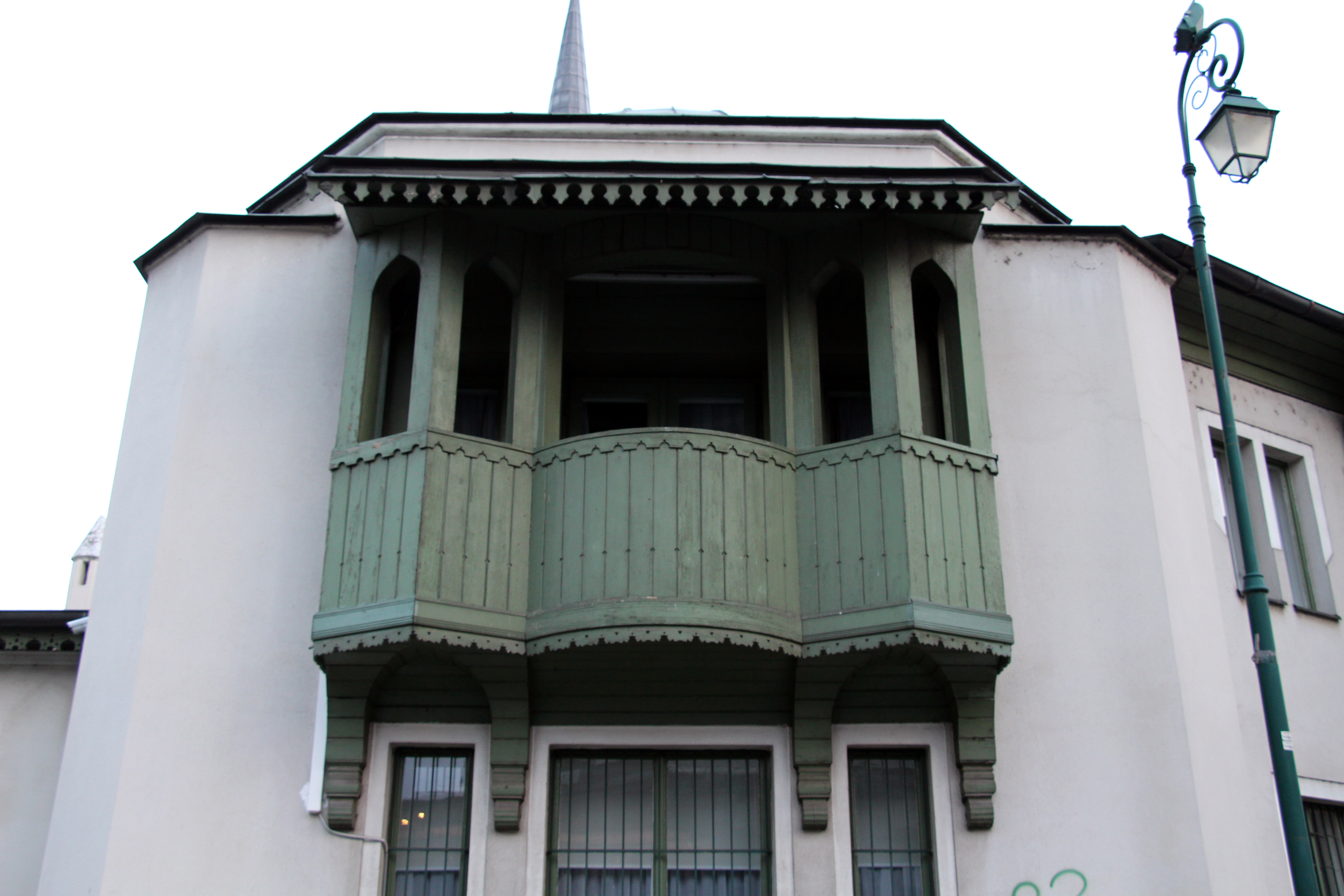
One of the mashrabiyas made in Bosnian fashion at the front of the mosque

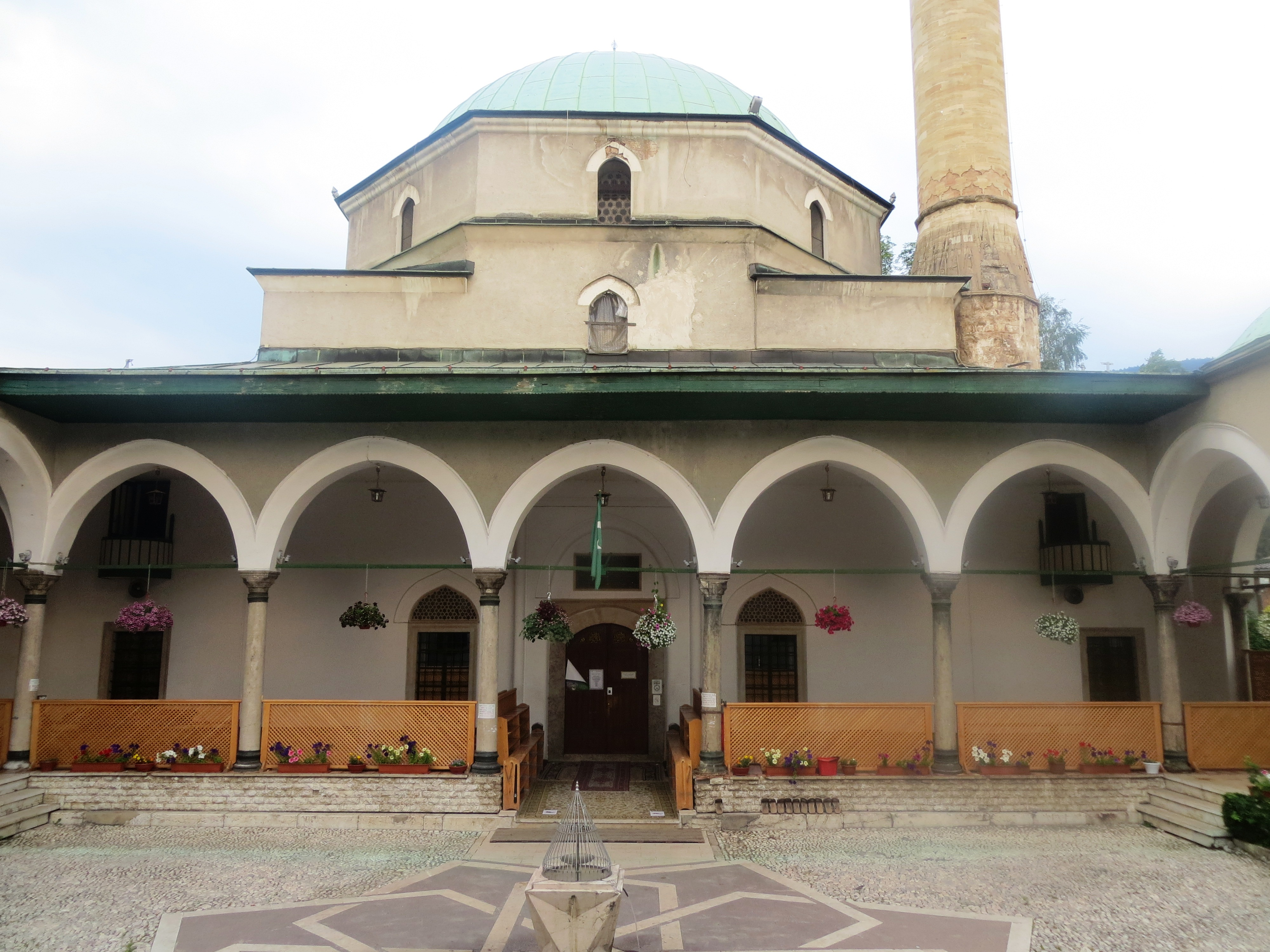
The sahn along with the riwaq and entrance

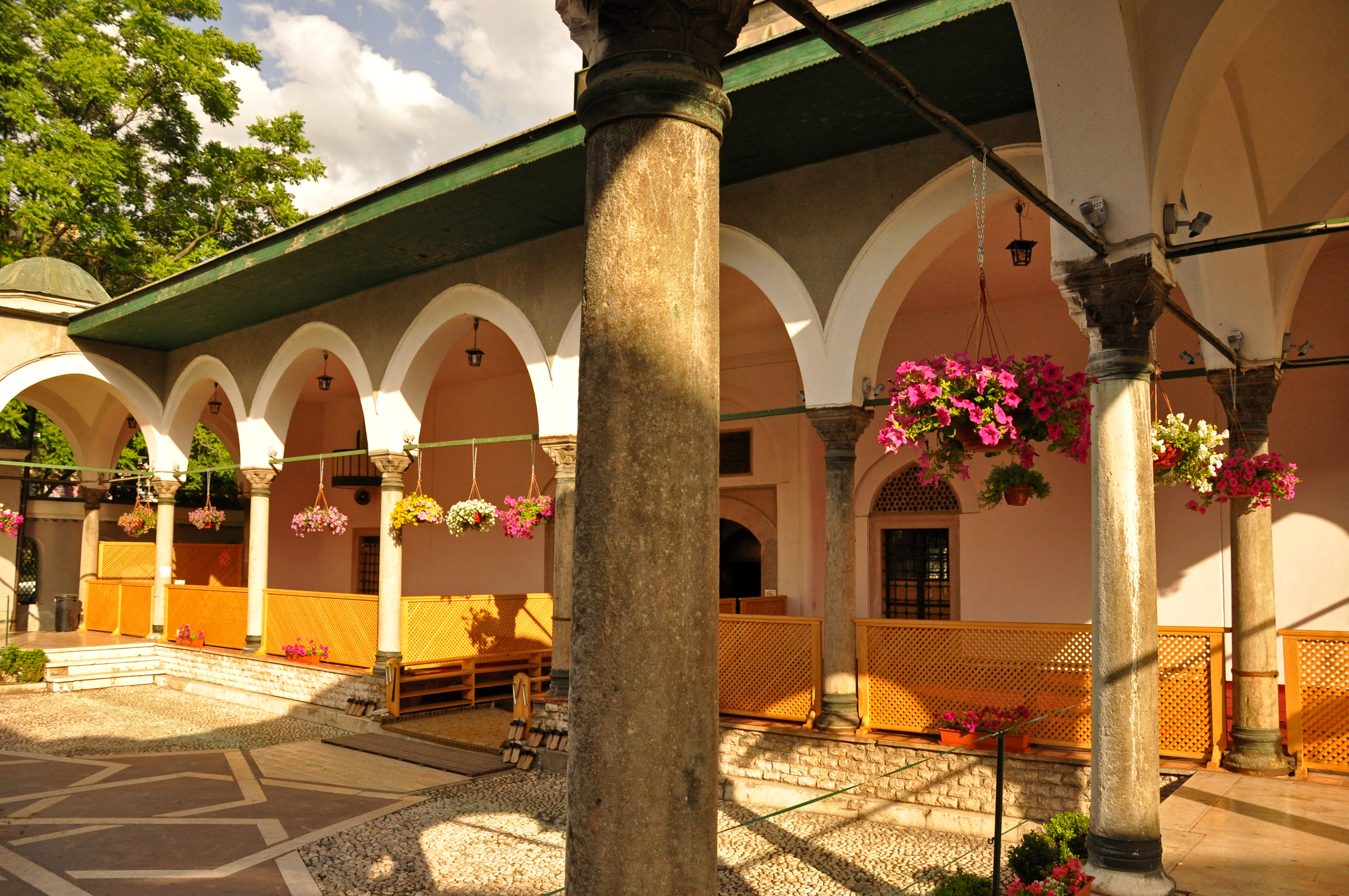
A view of the riwaq

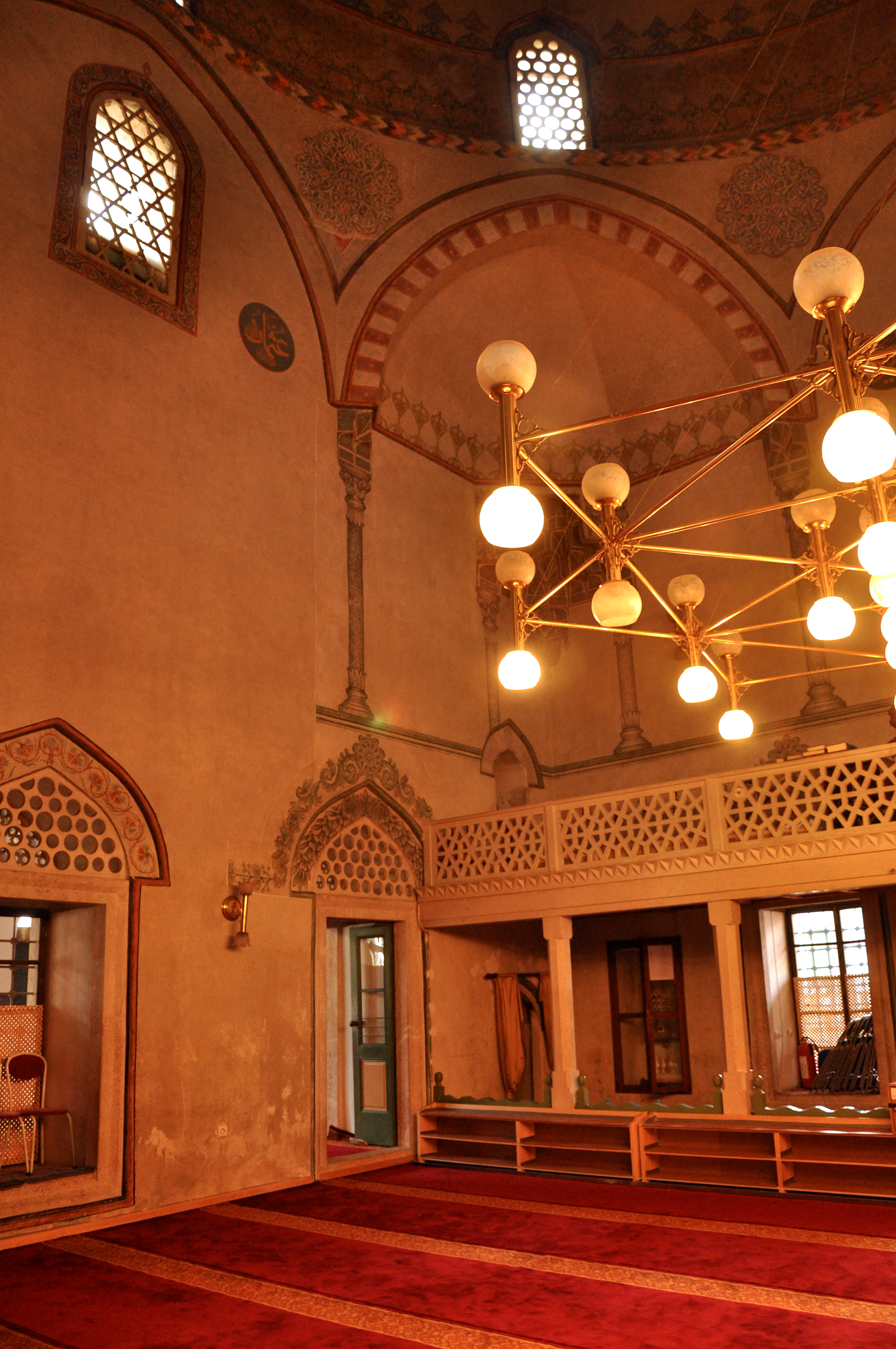
The prayer hall, with the women's upper gallery, and a view of Islamic frescos along the arches and squinches

== See also ==
- Islam in Bosnia and Herzegovina
- List of mosques in Bosnia and Herzegovina
