= Ćumurija Bridge =

Bridge over Miljacka in Sarajevo, Bosnia and Herzegovina

Coordinates: 43.8569°N 18.4267°E

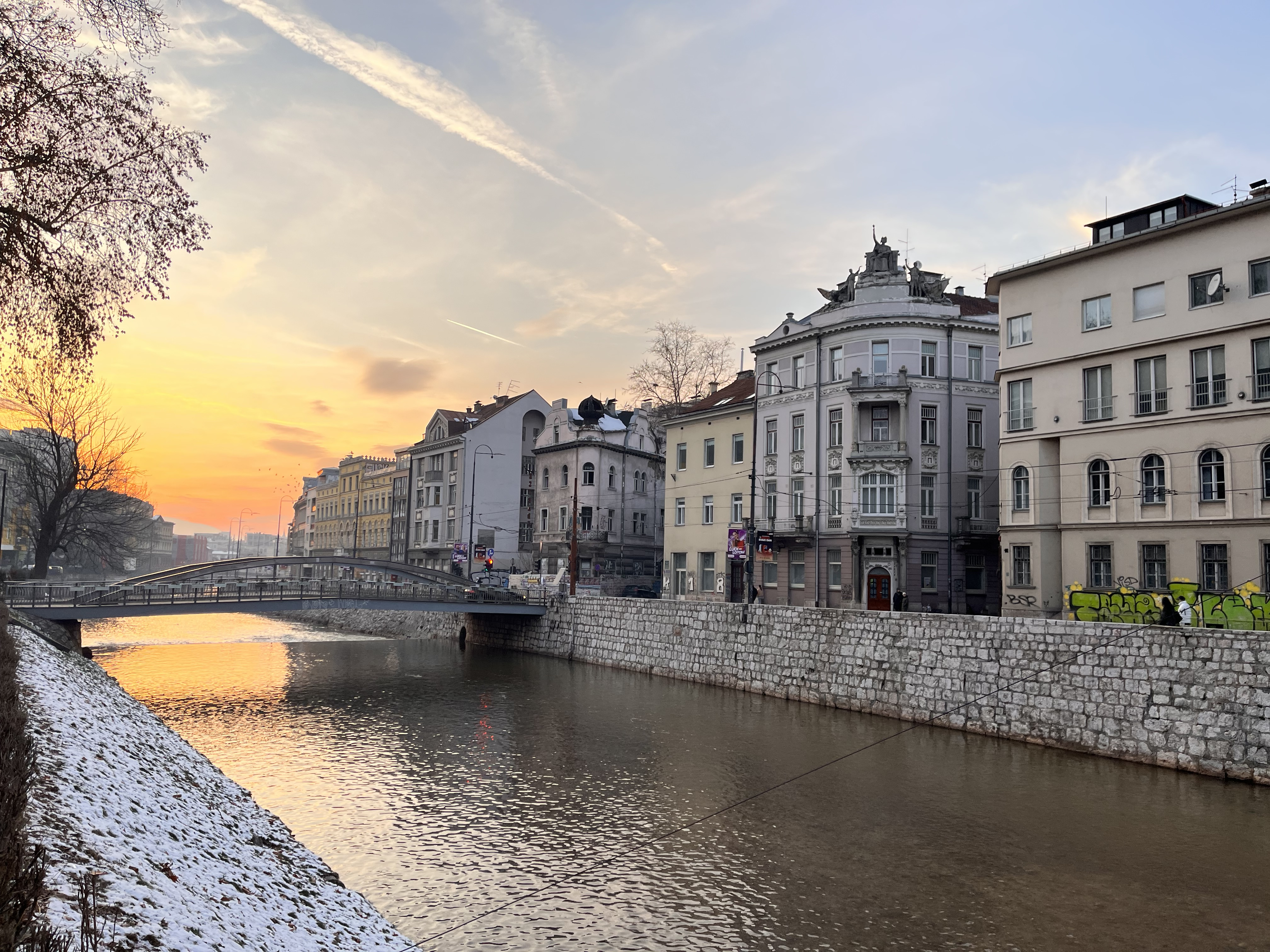
Ćumurija Bridge

The Ćumurija Bridge in Sarajevo, Bosnia and Herzegovina carries vehicular and pedestrian traffic over the River Miljacka. It was constructed in 1886.

The first bridge was built of wood in 1565, during the time of the Ottoman Empire, and connected two mosques on either side of the river. The name Ćumurija derives from ćumur, meaning charcoal, which at one time was thrown from the bridge into the river.
