= Emperor's Bridge =

Bridge over Miljacka in Sarajevo, Bosnia and Herzegovina

Emperor's bridge Careva ćuprija or Carev most
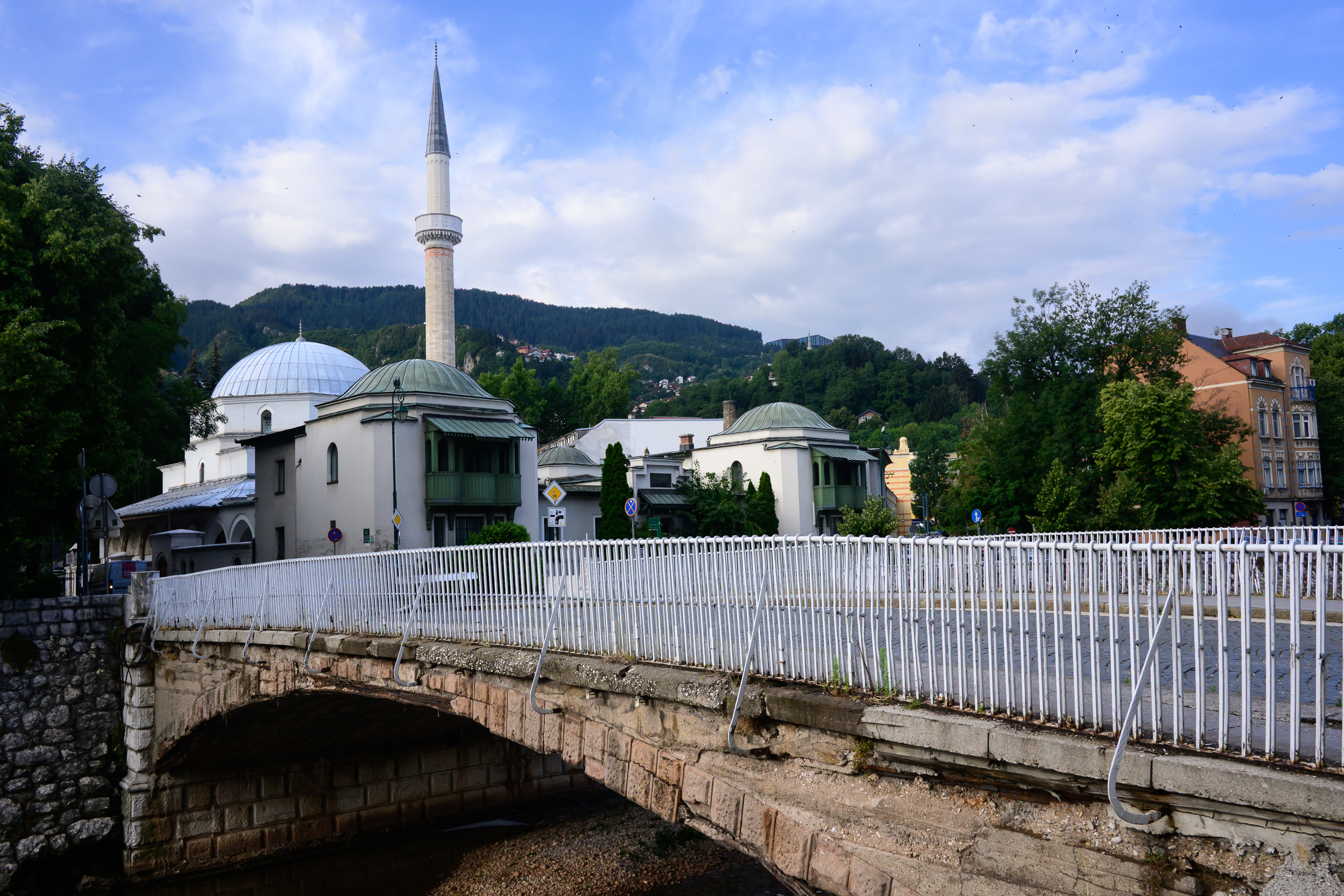
- View of the Emperor's Bridge from the north bank of the River Miljacka
- Coordinates: 43°51′29″N 18°25′50″E
- Carries: Pedestrians and bicycles
- Crosses: Miljacka

Characteristics
- Material: Limestone, mortar

Location
- Interactive map of Emperor's bridge

The Emperor's Bridge (Careva ćuprija or Carev most) is a bridge located across the Miljacka River in Sarajevo, Bosnia and Herzegovina. It spans the river in front of the Emperor's Mosque, from which the bridge takes its name. The bridge is declared a National Monument of Bosnia and Herzegovina by KONS, since 2009.

== History ==
The original bridge was built by the nobleman Isa-beg Ishaković sometime before 1462, slightly lower than the current one (in front of the entrance to the mosque of the same name - the Emperor's Mosque). It is not certain whether the original bridge was made of stone or wood, but traditional view is that it was built of wood, and in the 16th century the Bosnian governor Gazi Husrev-beg replaced it with a one made of stone. The bridge is mentioned in some sources as Isabeg's Bridge, and from the mid-17th century it was called Emperor's Bridge. The bridge was destroyed and rebuilt several times. In 1619 it was destroyed in a flood and was soon repaired. In April 1739 the swollen Miljacka damaged the bridge again, along with the Latin and Ali-pasha's Bridges, and all three bridges were soon rebuilt. On November 15, 1791 the Miljacka destroyed all of Sarajevo's bridges, except for Šeher-Ćehaj's Bridge, and almost the entire Emperor's Bridge. Immediately after this event, two wooden bridges were built across the Miljacka near the Emperor's Bridge. The bridge was rebuilt in 1792 by the merchant and wealthy hajji Mustajbeg Bešlija (-1796). On that occasion, Mehmed Džudi ef. Čohadžić composed a tarih (inscription) about the bridge's reconstruction:

"To znači: Vlasnik hajra, aga vojske darežljivih, hadži Bešli aga kome se dobra dova čini:

Vidio je da je nesreća poplave porušila ovu ćupriju te ju je u ime Boga obnovio i sazidao.

Kada je dosuđeno da Božijom dobrotom bude gotoova, rekao je Džudija u dvije polovice stiha njoj dva tariha:

Hadži Bešlijina ćuprija je uistinu poput Iskenderova zida; Divna ćuprija građeniva Bešlije H. Mustafe 1207. " (1792/93).

At the end of the 19th century, during the Austro-Hungarian occupation, the bridge was demolished due to its poor condition, after which a new one was built based on the original bridge. The bridge has retained its original name.
