= Drvenija Bridge =

Bridge over Miljacka in Sarajevo, Bosnia and Herzegovina

Drvenija
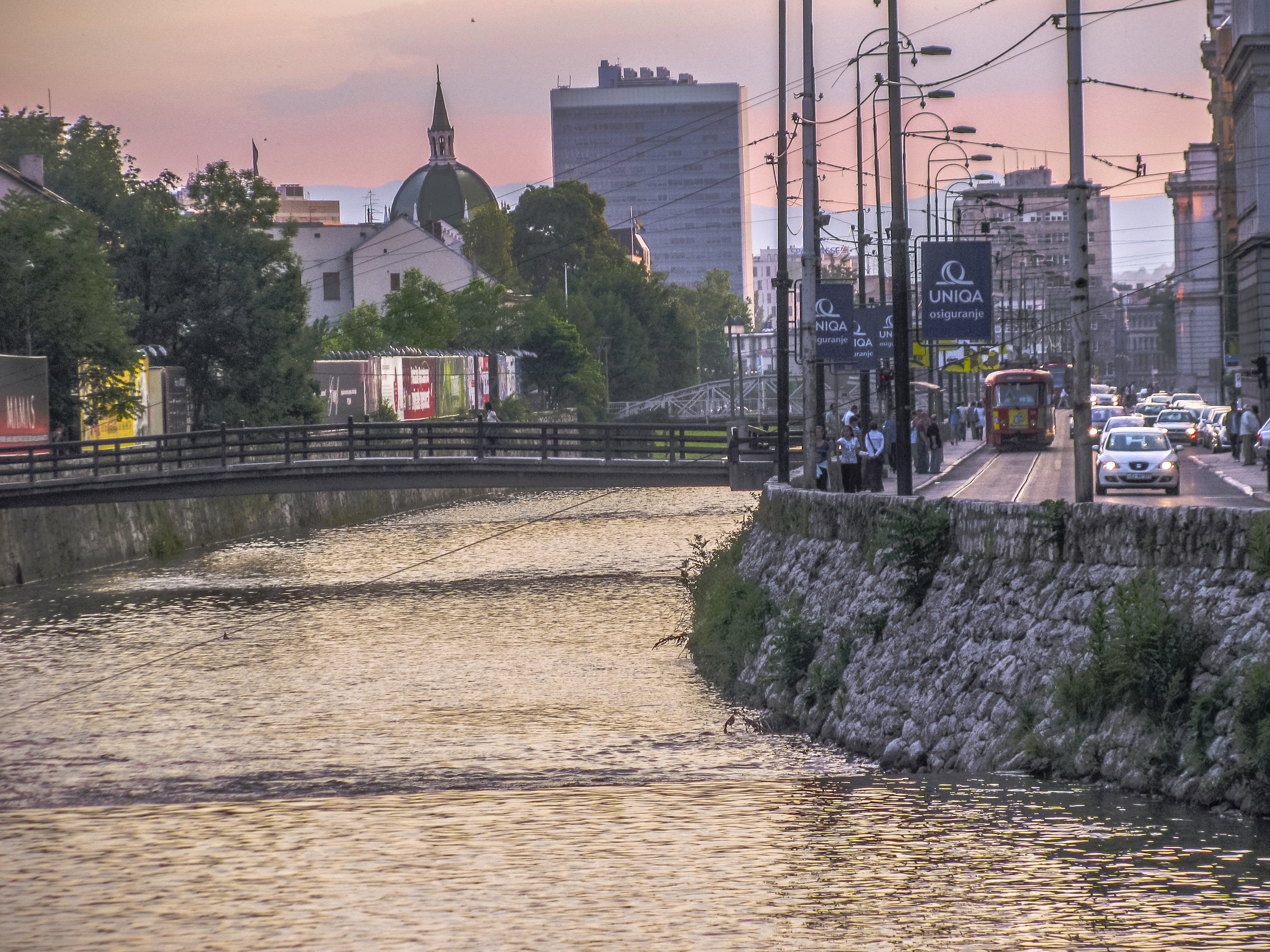
- Drvenija bridge looking downstream the Miljacka, Sarajevo
- Coordinates: 43°52′N 18°25′E
- Carries: pedestrians and bicycles
- Crosses: Miljacka
- Locale: Sarajevo
- Owner: City
- Maintained by: Municipality

Characteristics
- Material: Reinforced concrete & wood
- No. of spans: 1

Location
- Interactive map of Drvenija

The Drvenija Bridge is a bridge located in Sarajevo, Bosnia and Herzegovina.

The bridge was built during the Austro-Hungarian reign in 1898 and crosses the river Miljacka. It is important heritage in downtown Sarajevo, and a feature in city's social life. It is one of the busiest pedestrian bridges over the Miljacka.

In 2019, the City of Sarajevo initiated conservation and restoration work on the bridge, on account of damage to the walkways, concrete parts, and the bridge railing, due to atmospheric influences.
