= Čobanija Bridge =

Bridge over Miljacka in Sarajevo, Bosnia and Herzegovina

Coordinates: 43.8564°N 18.4203°E

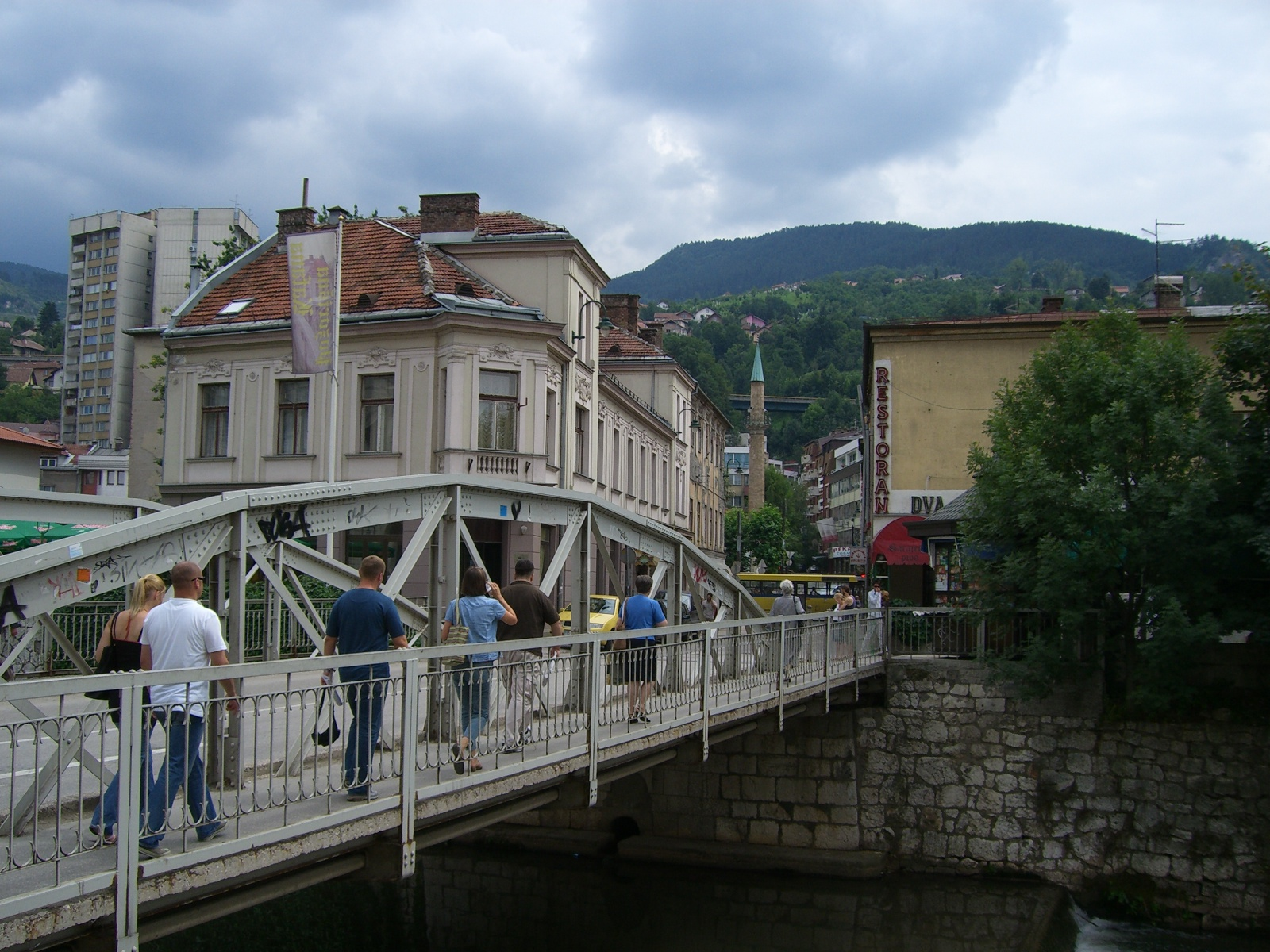
Čobanija bridge

The Čobanija Bridge is an iron bridge, located in Sarajevo, Bosnia and Herzegovina, which crosses the River Miljacka. It was erected in 1887.

The bridge stands on a site previously occupied by a wooden bridge, known as the Šejhanija bridge, which had been built in the 16th century.

The bridge is located near the National Theatre and the Main Post Office and connects Kulovića Street on the right bank of the river with Čobanija Street on the left. The bridge was badly damaged during the Bosnia War and underwent a full renovation in 1998.
