= Miljacka =

River in Bosnia and Herzegovina

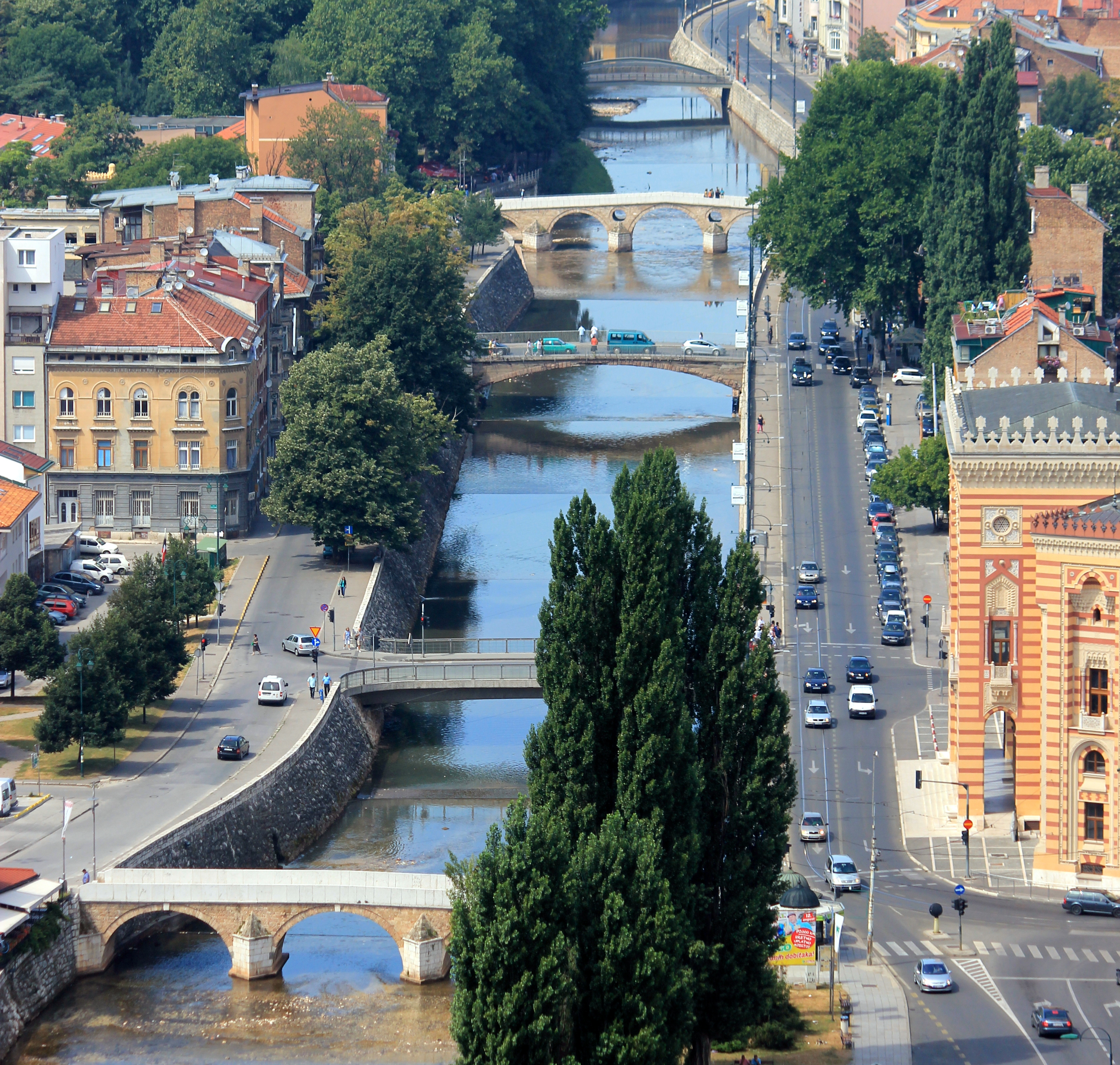
- Miljacka in Sarajevo

- Location within Bosnia and Herzegovina

Location
- Country: Bosnia and Herzegovina
- Municipality: Pale, Istočni Stari Grad, Stari Grad, Novo Sarajevo, Novi Grad, Ilidža

Physical characteristics
- Source: Paljanska Miljacka Gornje Pale
  - location: Pale
  - coordinates: 43.787836°N 18.572217°E
  - elevation: 1,025 metres (3,363 ft)
- 2nd source: Mokranjska Miljacka Mokro Cave
  - location: Kadino Selo near Mokro
  - coordinates: 43.924791°N 18.595741°E
  - elevation: 1,135 metres (3,724 ft)
- 3rd source: Confluence of the two Miljacka, Mokranjska & Paljanska
  - location: near Bulozi, Stari Grad
  - coordinates: 43.8347241°N 18.4889174°E
  - elevation: 627 metres (2,057 ft)
- Mouth: Bosna river
  - location: Bojnik, Sarajevo
  - coordinates: 43.869409°N 18.290759°E
  - elevation: 488 metres (1,601 ft)
- Length: Mokranjska Miljacka 21 kilometres (13 mi); Paljanska Miljacka 13 kilometres (8.1 mi); from the confluence to mouth in Bosna 21 kilometres (13 mi)
- Discharge
  - average: 5.7 cubic metres per second (200 cu ft/s)
  - minimum: cca. 2.5 m^{3}/s

Basin features
- Progression: Bosna→ Sava→ Danube→ Black Sea
- River system: Danube>Black Sea
- Landmarks: Bentbaša
- Tributaries
  - left: Bistrica (Jahorinska), Bistrički Potko
  - right: Lapišnica, Mošćanica, Koševski Potok
- Waterbodies: Bentbaša
- Bridges: Goat's Bridge (Bosnian: Kozija Ćuprija), Šeher-Ćehaja Bridge, Emperor's Bridge, Latin Bridge (aka Principov most), Ćumurija Bridge, Drvenija Bridge, Čobanija Bridge, Festina lente bridge, Skenderija Bridge (aka Ajfelov most), Suada and Olga bridge (aka Vrbanja most)

The Miljacka (Serbian Cyrillic: Миљацка) is a river in Bosnia and Herzegovina that passes through Sarajevo. Numerous city bridges have been built to cross it.

== Characteristics ==
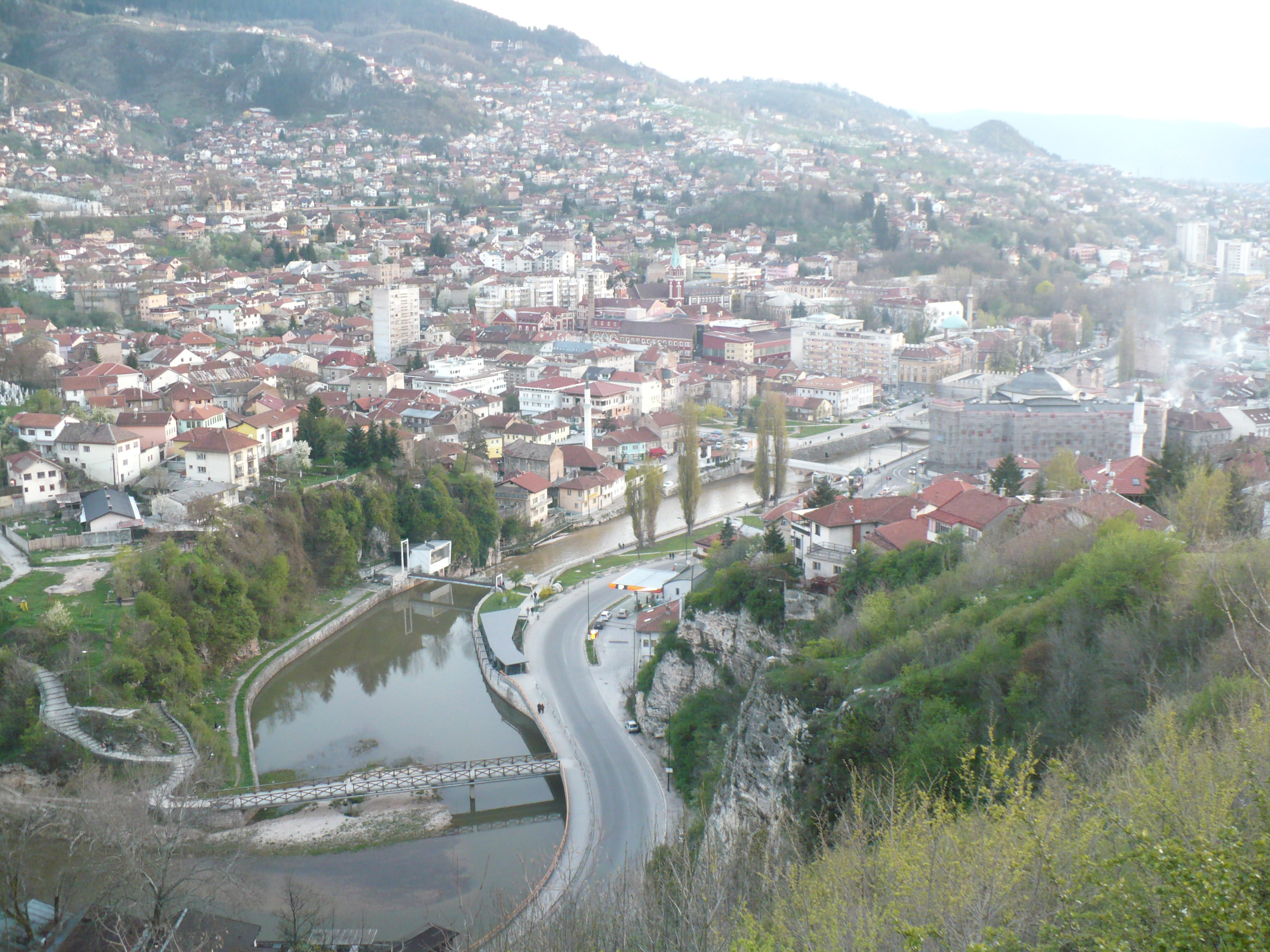
Eastern entrance and cliff Diving location

The Miljacka river originates from the confluence of the Paljanska Miljacka and Mokranjska Miljacka rivers. The Miljacka is a rather small river, only 21 kilometres (13 mi) long from the confluence, or 34 kilometres (21 mi) and 42 kilometres (26 mi) depending on source (Pale or Mokro). By the time this tributary flows into the Bosna river in Sarajevo, it has an average discharge of 5.7 m^{3}/s. The Miljacka river flows generally from east to west through the city.

The Bosna is a right tributary of the Sava River, with its mouth in Bosanski Šamac. That river in turn flows into the Danube River, which goes southeast and enters the Black Sea chiefly in Romania.

=== Paljanska Miljacka ===
The Paljanska Miljacka, 13 kilometres (8.1 mi) in length, begins at Gornje Pale, 10 kilometres (6.2 mi) eastward in the town of Pale, on the slopes of Jahorina, near Begovina), at an elevation of 1,025 metres (3,363 ft).

=== Mokranjska Miljacka ===
The Mokranjska Miljacka, 21 kilometres (13 mi) in length, springs from a large cave, yet to be fully explored, near the village of Kadino Selo at an elevation of 1,135 metres (3,724 ft) near the base of Romanija mountain.

==== Mokranjska Miljacka cave ====
The cave at the spring of Mokranjska Miljacka, located about 7 kilometres (4.3 mi) from the village of Mokro, near Pale, is officially the longest cave in Bosnia and Herzegovina. As of August 2015, the length of mapped caverns was 7.2 kilometres (4.5 mi). The Miljacka runs out of the cave practically as an underground flow, a subterranean river, where its temperature is measured as low as 5 degrees and temperature of air as low as 8 degrees Celsius.

The exact location of the cave is not yet mapped for the public, but local authorities have released a map which can be used to find its location, as well as a gallery of discoveries within the cave.

A new species of spiders, named Nemanela Lade ("Lada's Little Monster" for its discoverer, Dr. Lada Lukić-Bilela from the Institute for Genetic Technology, Sarajevo), has been found here. Also found are at least five more species of spider, as well as certain species of bats. A skeleton head of a cave bear has also been found at the location.

Paleontological finds, traces of human habitation, stalactites and stalagmites, as well as pisolite rocks, the river Miljacka wellspring, all makes this cave among most valuable speleological objects in Bosnia and Herzegovina. Researchers believe to have discovered bubbles of air, a possible sign of tectonic activity.

== Environment ==
Because of its poor discharge, the Miljacka is known for its peculiar smell and brown waters. Miljacka river cascades, which regulate the waterbed and enrich the water with oxygen, trap plastic scraps, stranded balls, car tires, and various other waste. The main collector that drains fecal matter is parallel to the flow of the river up to its mouth at the river Bosna. The sewer system is not connected to the main collector, causing leakage of fecal matter directly into the waters of the Miljacka in several places. During the Bosnian War, water treatment was stopped and plant equipment looted, preventing the local government from dealing with the issue. Estimates of the cost to repair the wastewater plant range from 50 to 60 million euros.

In April 2015, a project called Čista rijeka Miljacka (Clean river Miljacka) was presented. The aim of the project was to bring the river status to category A, which would make the water clean enough for swimming.

In August 2015, the city of Sarajevo signed a contract with ER Project d.o.o. company to clean up 48 river cascades from Šeher-Ćehaja Bridge to Dolac Malta suburb bridge.

=== Floods of 2014 ===
The river swelled almost to the level of city bridges during the 2014 Southeast Europe floods, which brought significant flooding to Bosnia and Herzegovina.

=== Floods of 2021 ===
The Miljacka was close to submerging some bridges in Sarajevo during the 2021 Bosnia and Herzegovina floods.

== Bridges ==
There are over a dozen bridges over the river Miljacka. Some of the better known ones are:

- Goat's Bridge (Bosnian: "Kozija Ćuprija")
- Šeher-Ćehaja Bridge
- Emperor's Bridge
- Latin Bridge (also known as "Principov most", namesake of Archduke Franz Ferdinand's assassin Gavrilo Princip). The assassination carried out by Princip, which led to World War I, took place at the entrance on this bridge. Gavrilo's co-conspirator Nedeljko Čabrinović, another member of the Bosnia-Herzegovinian Mlada Bosna movement, jumped into the river Miljacka from the bridge, seconds after throwing a grenade toward the archduke's car. He intended to hide below the bridge so that he could take and swallow a cyanide powder wrapped into a piece of paper. But the poison got so wet from the fall into the shallow Miljacka (only 10 centimetres (3.9 in) deep) that it dissolved but lost its toxicity. Čabrinović was dragged alive from the river and arrested.
- Ćumurija Bridge
- Drvenija Bridge
- Čobanija Bridge
- Festina lente bridge
- Skenderija Bridge (a.k.a. "Ajfelov most")
- Suada and Olga bridge (a.k.a. "Vrbanja most")
- Bosmal Bridge (Malaysian-Bosnian Friendship Bridge), a.k.a. "Malezijski most" and "Bosmalov most".
- and several unnamed modern bridges.

== Diving ==
Bentbaša Cliff Diving is a sport organized at location Bentbaša dam every summer at the eastern entrance into the city of Sarajevo (in close proximity to Vijećnica, a library and former City Hall). The diving location water depth is at 3.5 to 4.4 meters depending time of month. Support to this sport in Sarajevo was given by Red Bull Cliff Diving World Series champion Rhiannan Iffland and competitor Jonathan Paredes who attended the 2019 edition.

Past champions of the event:

- 2019 - (Serbia) Dragan Milnović (head jump) / (Slovenia) Aleš Karničnik (high jump)
- 2018 - (Bosnia and Herzegovina) Igor Arsenić from Banja Luka
- 2017 - N/A
- 2016 - N/A
- 2015 - (Bosnia and Herzegovina) Dino Bajrić from Sarajevo

== Image gallery ==
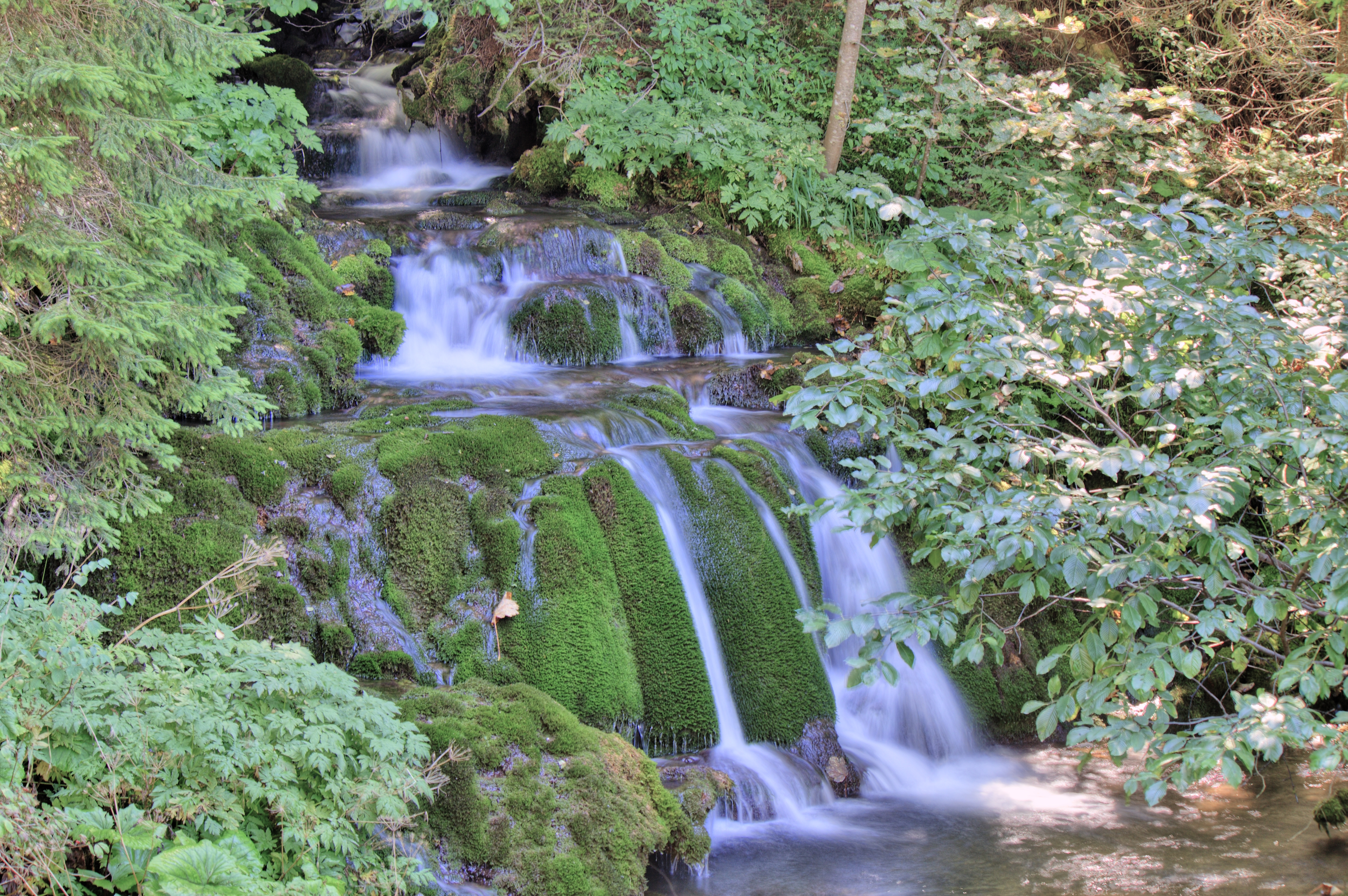
Paljanska Miljacka source at Gornje Pale, under the slopes of Jahorina

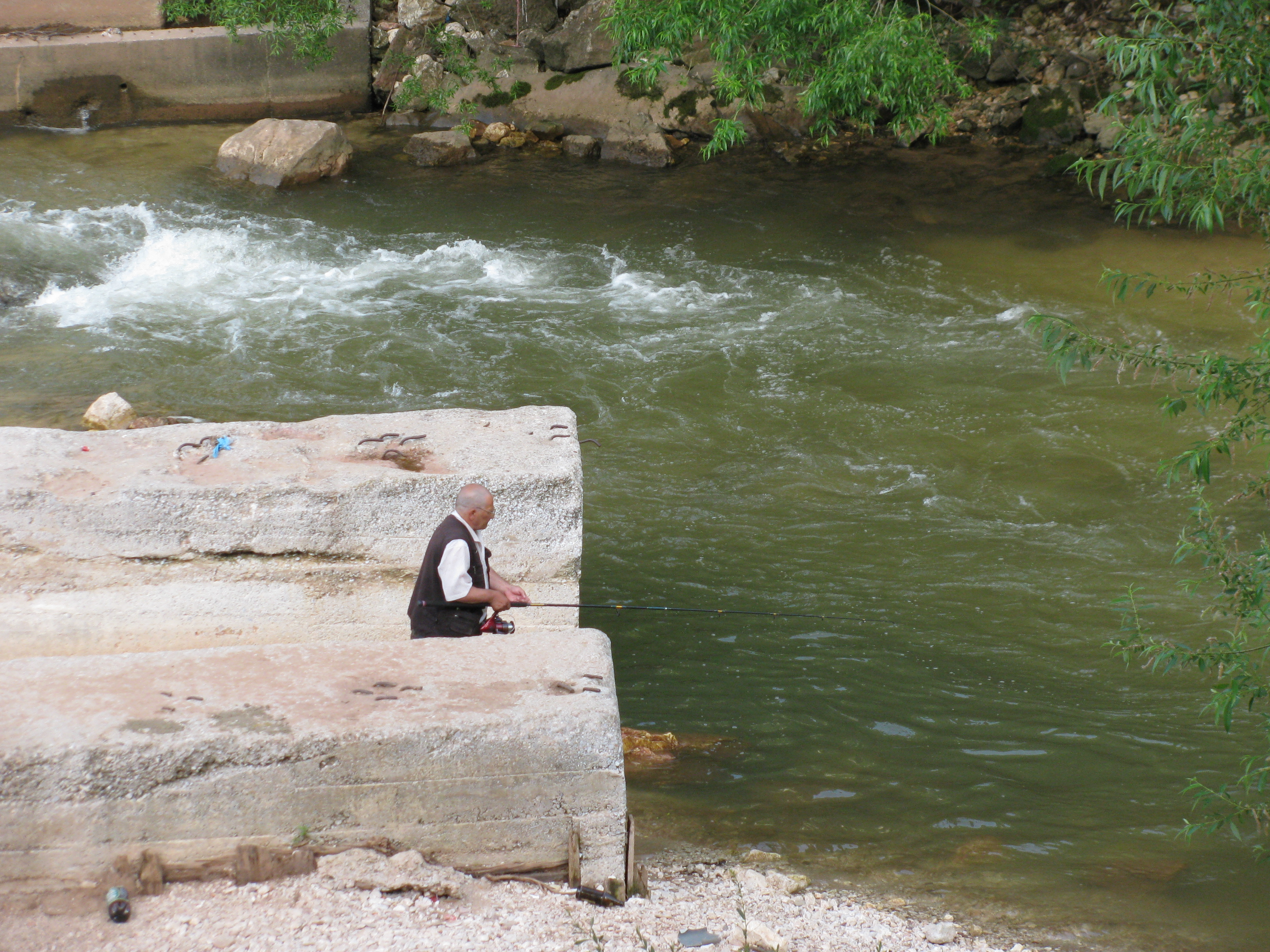
Fishing on Dariva (Miljacka Canyon between Bentbaša and Goat's Bridge)

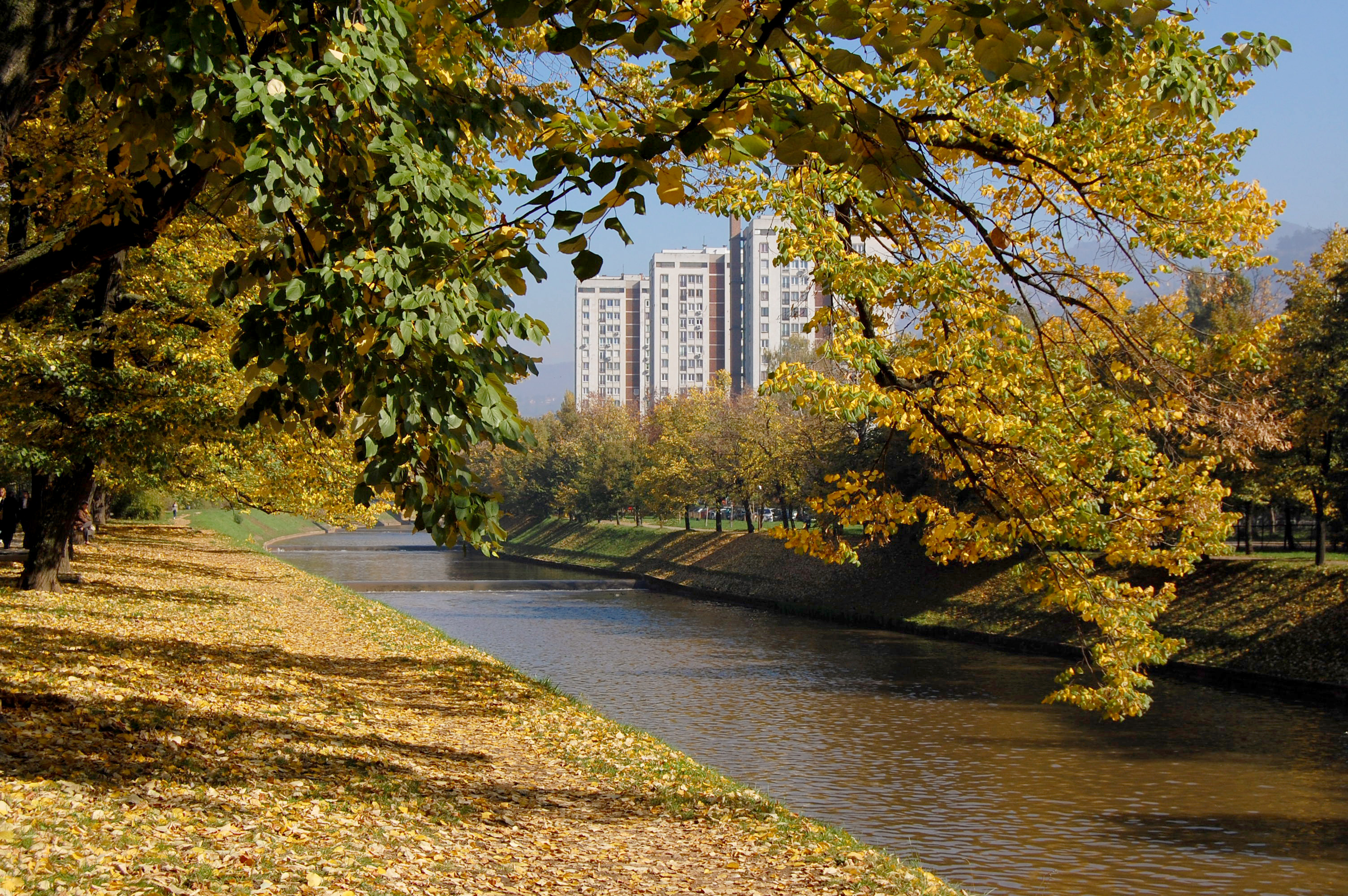
Wilson's Promenade, named after Thomas Woodrow Wilson

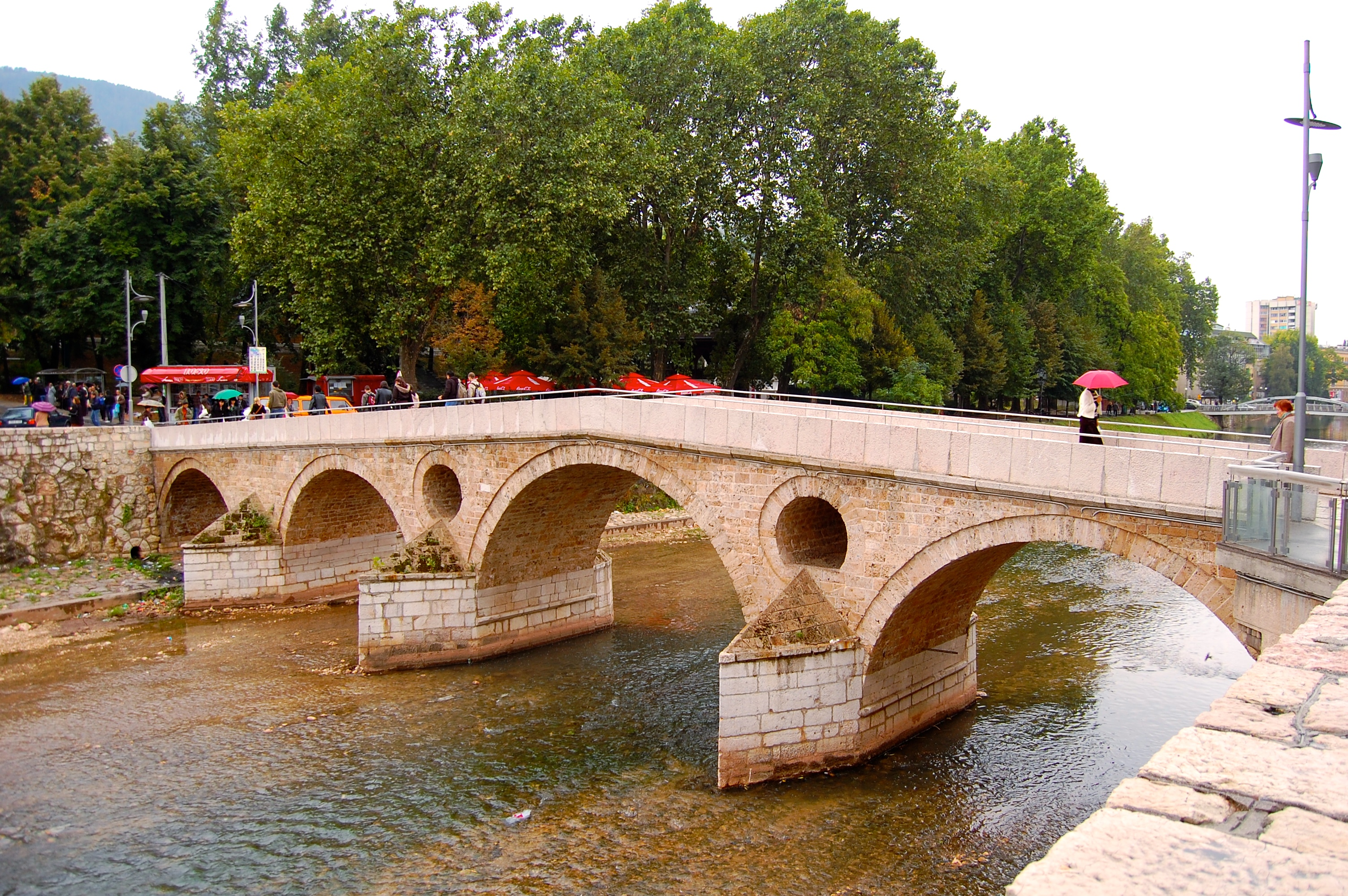
The Latin Bridge was the site of the assassination of Franz Ferdinand

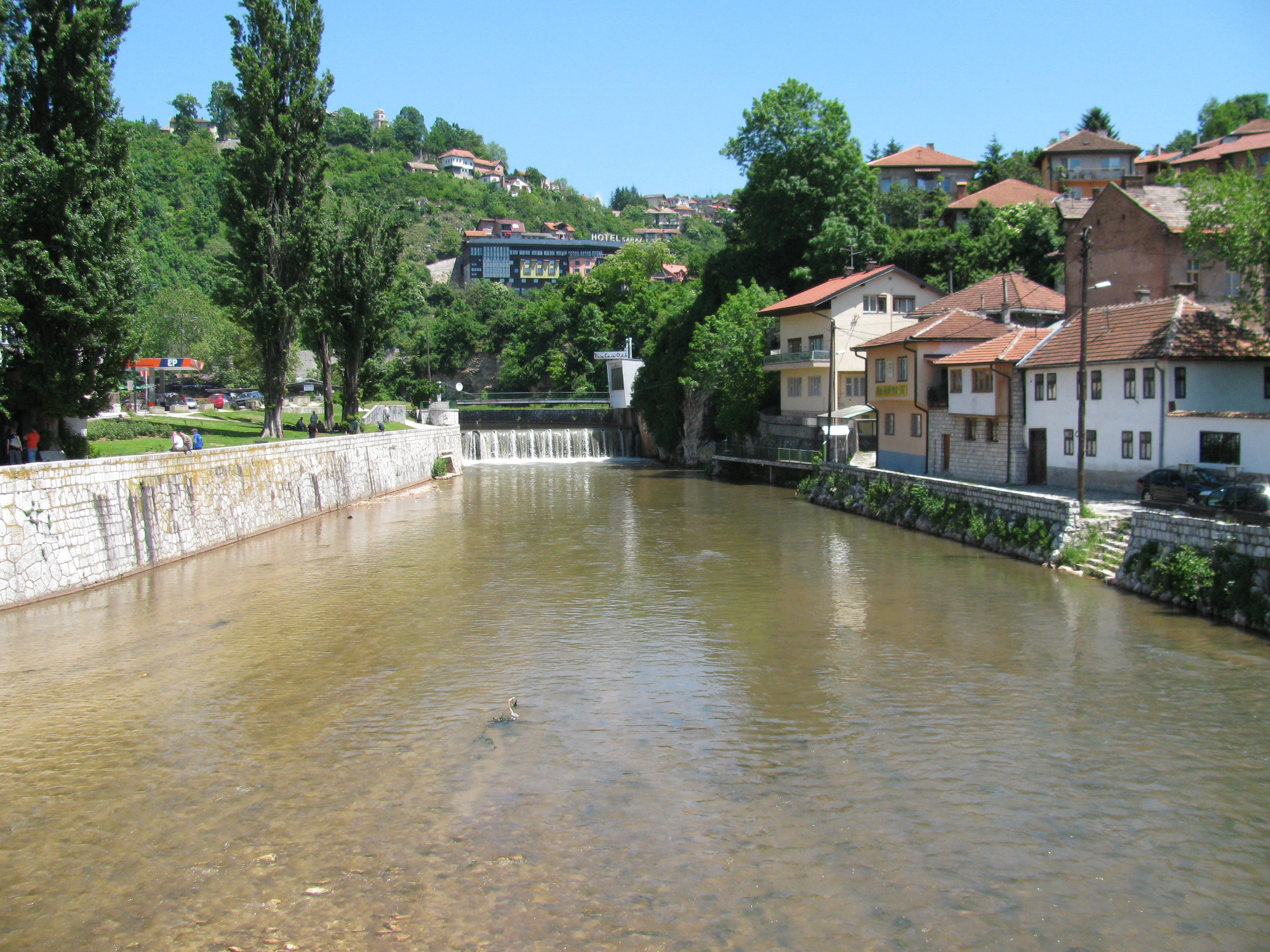
Bentbaša dam (Cliff Diving location)

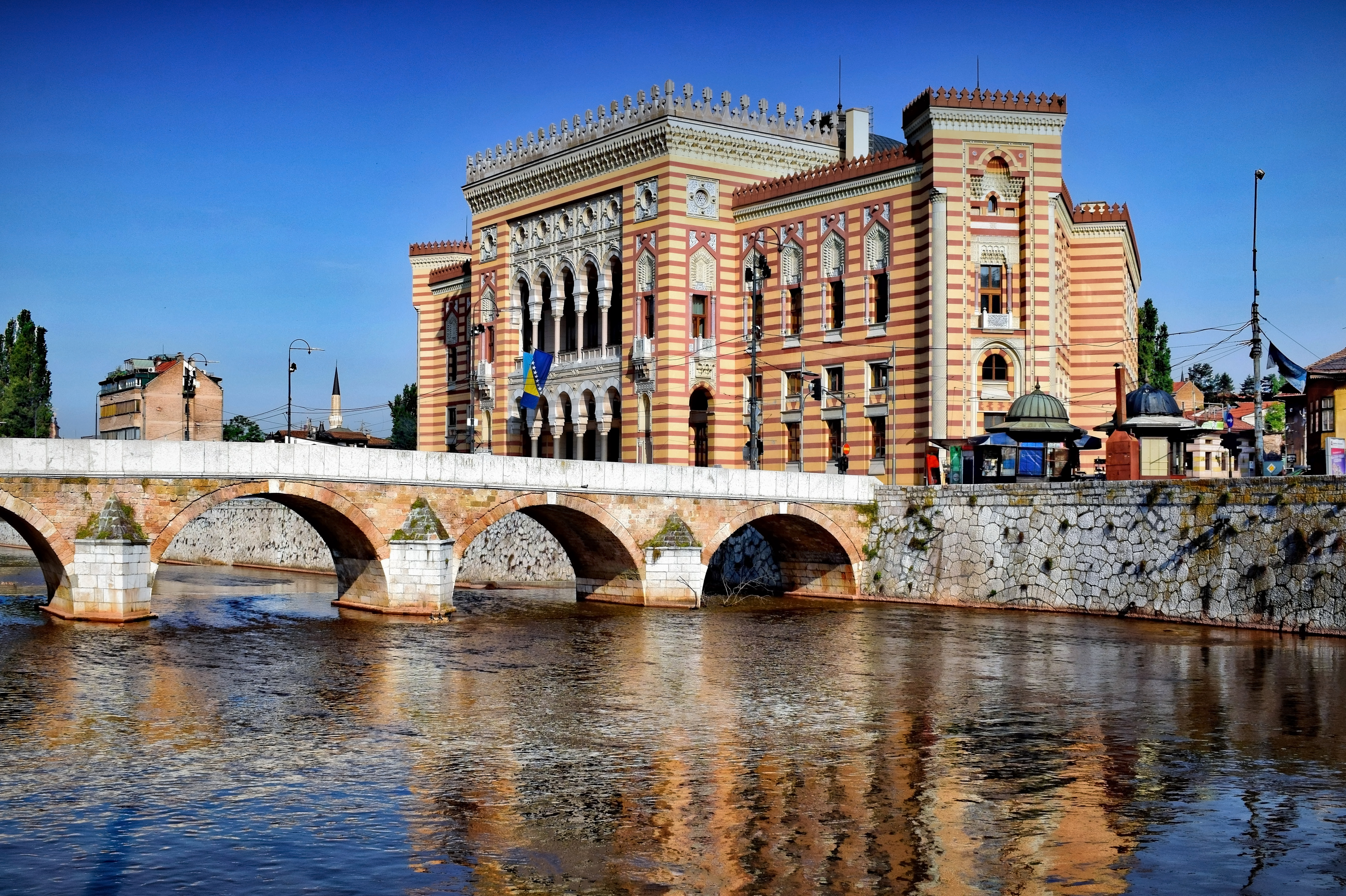
Library and City Hall

== Popular culture ==
A number of popular local songs were sung about Miljacka river, including "Halid Bešlić - Miljacka" and "Himzo Polovina - Kad ja pođoh na Bembašu".
