= Šeher-Ćehaja Bridge =

Ottoman stone-arch bridge over Miljacka in Sarajevo, Bosnia and Herzegovina

Šeher-Ćehaja Bridge Šeher-Ćehajina ćuprija
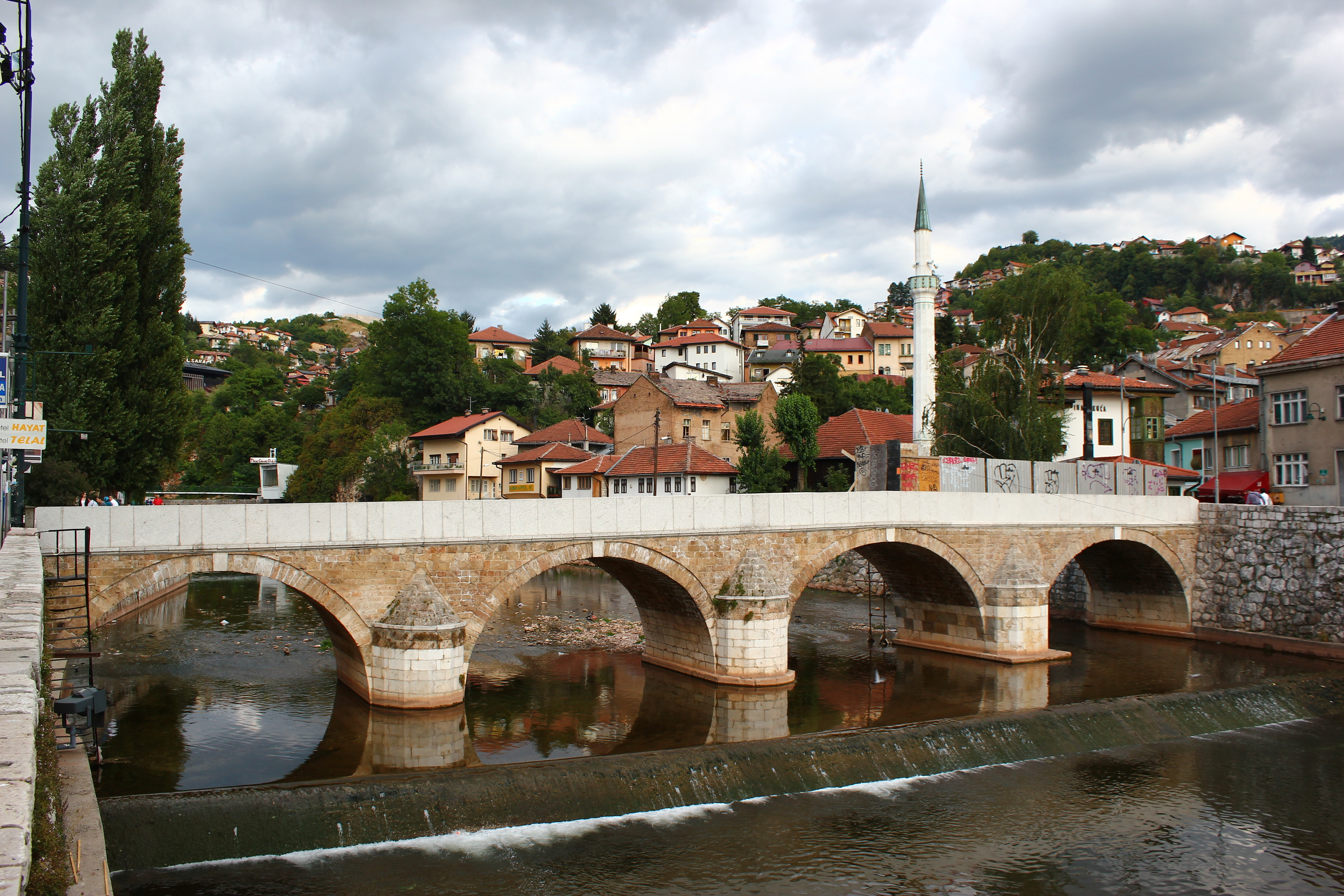
- Šeher-Ćehaja Bridge in 2012
- Coordinates: 43°51′31″N 18°26′02″E
- Carries: Pedestrians and bicycles
- Crosses: Miljacka

Characteristics
- Material: Tufa, limestone

Location
- Interactive map of Šeher-Ćehaja Bridge

Šeher Ćehaja Bridge (Bosnian, Croatian and Serbian: Šeher-Ćehajina ćuprija / Шехер-Ћехајина ћуприја) is a bridge which crosses the river Miljacka in Sarajevo, Bosnia and Herzegovina. The name can be translated as "Mayor's Bridge" from the Turkish word for mayor.

During Ottoman rule, 13 bridges were built in Sarajevo; Šeher Ćehaja Bridge is one of the most impressive ones among them. The only written document indicating the year of the erection of the bridge is a transcript of the chronogram in Mostar, indicating it was built in 994 AH (1585/1586 CE). According to the source, the bridge was constructed by a man named "Alija, known as Hafizadić".

The Šeher Ćehaja Bridge has been damaged several times: during the floods of 1619 and 1629, as well as in 1843 when the Miljacka destroyed two pillars during repairs by Mustafa-paša. The bridge was again damaged in 1880.

KONS, the national agency that designates national heritage sites, has inscribed the bridge into the List of National Monuments of Bosnia and Herzegovina.
