= Mokro, Pale =

Mokro
- Village
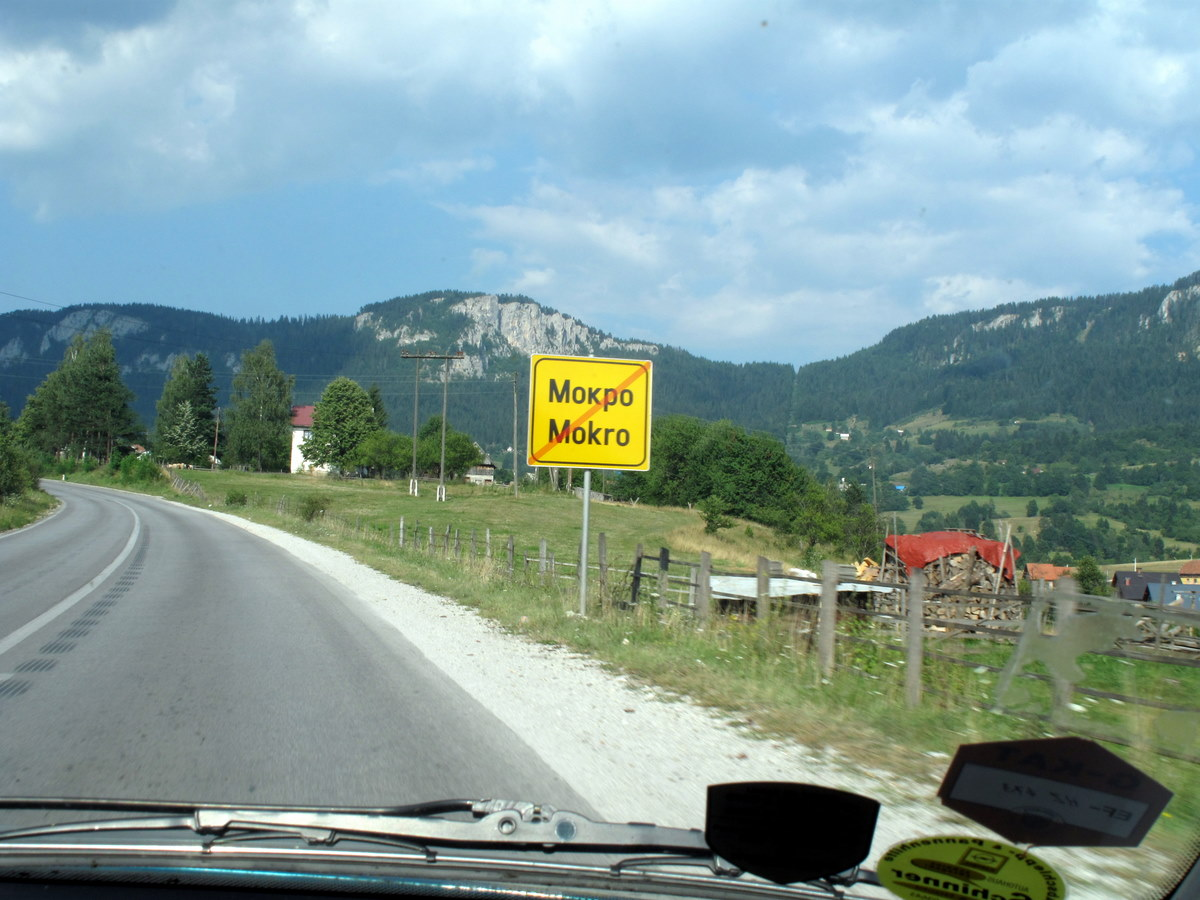

- Location within Bosnia and Herzegovina
- Coordinates: 43°53′44″N 18°38′13″E
- Country: Bosnia and Herzegovina
- Entity: Republika Srpska
- Municipality: Pale
- Time zone: UTC+1 (CET)
  - Summer (DST): UTC+2 (CEST)

Mokro (Serbian: Мокро) is a village in the municipality of Pale, Bosnia and Herzegovina.
