= Kadino Selo (Pale) =

Kadino Selo Кадино Село
- Village
- Location within Bosnia and Herzegovina
- Coordinates: 43°55′10″N 18°37′51″E
- Country: Bosnia and Herzegovina
- Entity: Republika Srpska
- Municipality: Pale
- Time zone: UTC+1 (CET)
  - Summer (DST): UTC+2 (CEST)

Kadino Selo (Serbian Cyrillic: Кадино Село) is a village in the municipality of Pale, Bosnia and Herzegovina.
