= Museum of Literature and Theater Arts of Bosnia and Herzegovina =

- Muzej književnosti i pozorišne umjetnosti Bosne i Hercegovine
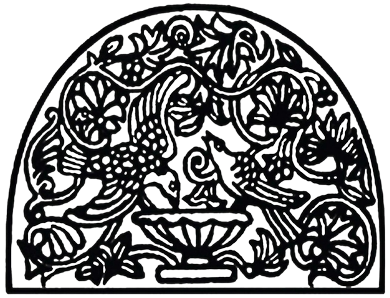
- Logo is reproduction of the museum facade relief with stylized birds drinking water from fountains

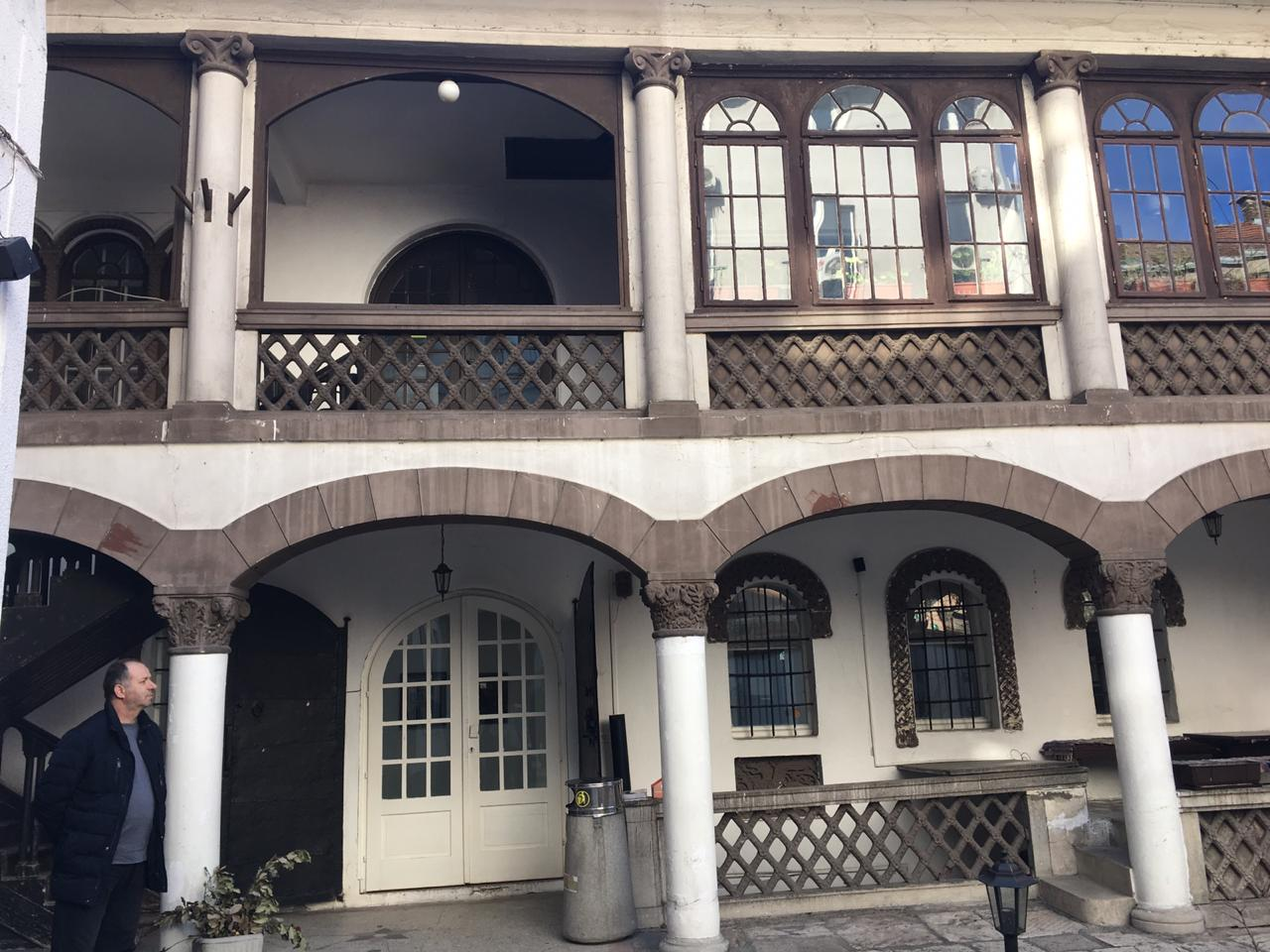
- Birth house of Vladislav Skarić, later owned by Despićs, today Museum of Literature and Theater Arts
- Former name: Muzej književnosti Bosne i Hercegovine transl. Museum of Literature
- Established: 1961
- Location: Sime Milutinovića Sarajlije 7, Sarajevo, Bosnia and Herzegovina
- Coordinates: 43.8578°N 18.4266°E
- Key holdings: the original manuscript of Ivo Andrić's novel The Bridge on the Drina
- Collections: 67 literary and 30 theater collections
- Collection size: 20,000+
- Founders: Razija Handžić, writer, first director
- Director: Šejla Šehabović
- Curators: Tamara Sarajlić-Slavnić, Đana Kukić
- Website: mkpubih.com

Museum of Literature and Theater Arts of Bosnia and Herzegovina (Serbo-Croatian: Muzej književnosti i pozorišnih umjetnosti Bosne i Hercegovine) is a literary art museum in Sarajevo, Bosnia and Herzegovina. It was established under the name Museum of Literature of Bosnia and Herzegovina in 1961 on the idea of then curator of literary collections in the Museum of Sarajevo, writer Razija Handžić, the future director. In 1970, the Theater Department was founded and added to the Museum of Literature.

The idea was conceived around 1955, and gained traction when prominent writer and future Nobel Prize in Literature laureate, Ivo Andrić, decided that the original manuscript of his novel The Bridge on the Drina be kept in Sarajevo. The museum is located in the Baščaršija neighborhood in the heart of Sarajevo, in the older of two Despić family house, built in the middle of the 19th century, and whose members donated it to City of Sarajevo.

== History ==
The idea was conceived around 1955, and gained traction when prominent writer and future Nobel Prize in literature laureate, Ivo Andrić, decided that the original manuscript of his novel The Bridge on the Drina be kept in Sarajevo. Eventually, the museum was founded in 1961 as the Museum of Literature, by then curator of literary collections in the Museum of Sarajevo, writer Razija Handžić, who will become museum's first director. She decided to take advantage of the fact that Ivo Andrić was awarded the Nobel Prize for Literature that year, and that he already donated valuable original manuscript of his novel.
In 1970, the Theater Department was founded and added to the Museum of Literature, expanded its activities to theatrical and performing arts. Museum's collection is distributed in 67 literary and 17 theater collections, which contain more than 20,000 items. Among the many valuable exhibits is the most important among them - the original manuscript of the Nobel Prize-winning novel The Bridge on the Drina.

== Logo ==
The facade of the house is decorated with reliefs, and above the entrance to the museum's Permanent Exhibition is a relief with stylized birds drinking water from fountains. The author of this decoration on the house was Iva Despić wife of Aleksandar "Aco" Despić. She was the first Bosnian female academic sculptor, and a former owner of the house and its tenant. Exactly this relief is used as the museum's logo today.

== Building ==
While the Museum of Literature and Theater Arts of Bosnia and Herzegovina was opened, in a way, thanks to Ivo Andrić's wish that the original manuscript of his novel The Bridge on the Drina be kept in Sarajevo, the building that houses the museum was donated by the family of Despićs, who actually donated two of their houses to the City of Sarajevo. That other was new Despić's house, which is also a place where dependence of the Museum of Sarajevo is situated, and is today simply known as the Despić House.

The Museum of Literature's building is located in Stari Grad (transl. Old Town), more precisely Baščaršija neighborhood in the heart of Sarajevo, in close proximity to the new Despić House. This older family house was built in the middle of the 19th century, and was originally owned by the Skarić family and was a birth house of Vladislav Skarić, and then the Despićs became owners.
Both buildings donated by Despićs are inscribed as a National Monuments of Bosnia and Herzegovina.

== Collections ==
Among the exhibits is the original manuscript of the Nobel Prize-winning novel The Bridge on the Drina.

Through museological principles museum collects literature and theater materials, such as manuscripts, correspondence, photographs, personal documents, pamphlets, magazines, books and articles, owned by the writers, literary critics, their heirs or other collectors. Also a complete study room of Silvije Strahimir Kranjčević is exhibited in the museum's Literary Department. For the Theater Department museum collects stage sets and individual photographs, programs, posters, production and costume sketches, paintings, portraits and other materials, dating back to 1920.
Collected materials are distributed in literary and theatrical collections, with around 50.000 items, and around 20.000 exhibited. The archive of the museum is made up of literary and theatrical collections of canonized Bosnian and Herzegovinian authors, as well as of those who were put aside over time because they were deemed as not belong to the national literary canon. An important part of the museum service is usage of its collections in the preparation of scientific researches and dissertations by researchers from Bosnia and Herzegovina and beyond.

== Publishing ==
Museum publishing included three books of documentary materials, about Peter Kočić, Svetozar Čorović, and Ivan Franjo Jukić respectively. The magazine Baština is museum's main outlet in print.

== Art Gallery Mak ==
In 1992 the ground floor has been rebuilt to the Art Gallery Mak, which is an exhibition space further extending the museum activities, and provide greater exhibiting offer. A total area is about 100m2, and it consists of three connected rooms. The gallery has been an exhibition space of the Museum of Literature and Theater Arts of BiH for decades, but it also offers its space for various other cultural and artistic manifestations, promotions, conferences and related events.

== Management ==
The founder of the museum was Razija Handžić, a writer, who was curator of literary collections in the Museum of Sarajevo at the time. She became a first director of the museum.
Today, the museum's director is Šejla Šehabović, and curators are Tamara Sarajlić-Slavnić, and Đana Kukić.

== See also ==
- List of museums in Bosnia and Herzegovina
- Despić House
- Sima Milutinović Sarajlija Street
