= List of tourist attractions in Sarajevo =

Some sites of interest in Sarajevo include:

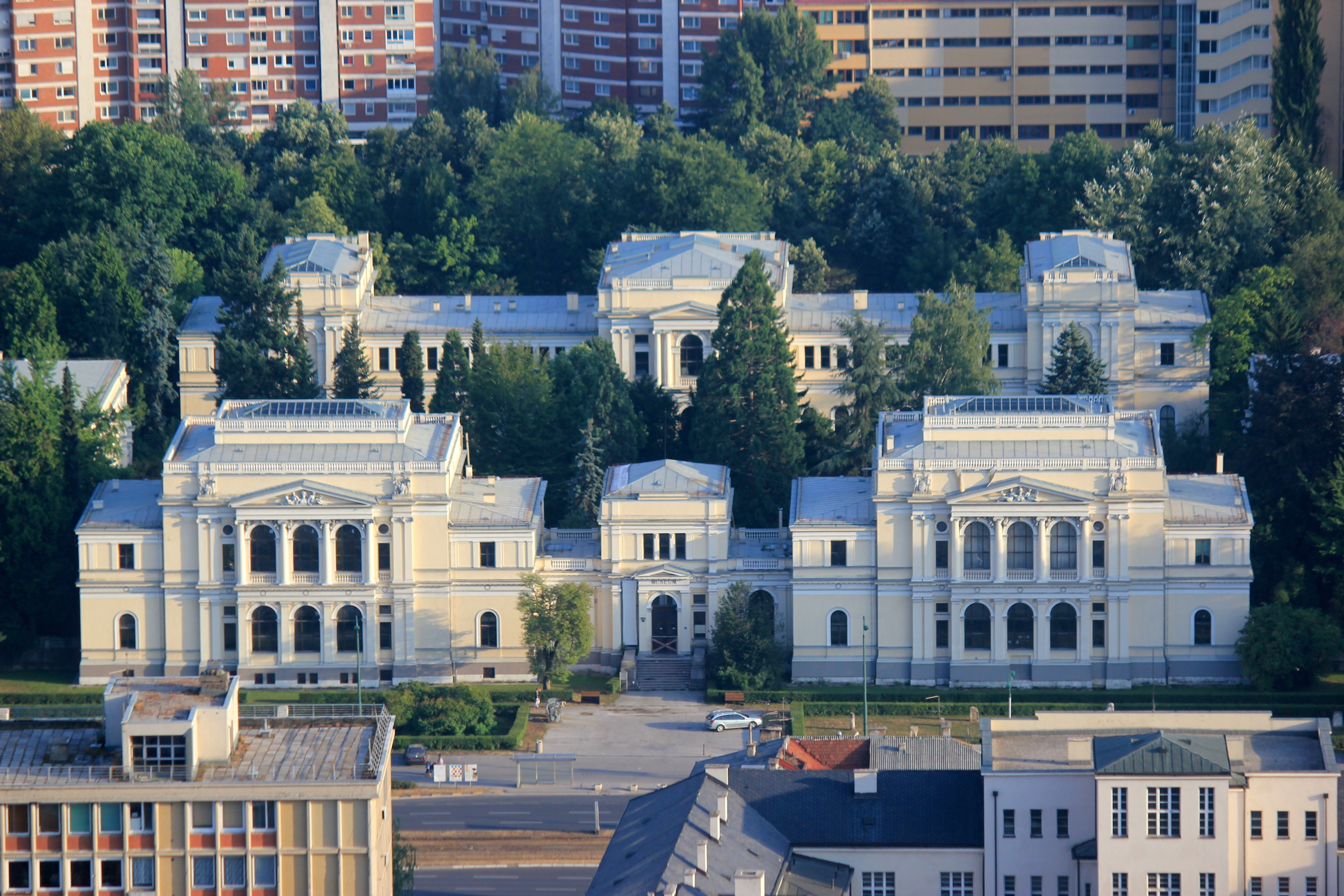
The National Museum of Bosnia and Herzegovina, in Sarajevo

== Cultural sites of interest ==
- Bosniak Institute
- Historical Museum of Bosnia and Herzegovina
- Museum of Sarajevo 1878–1918
- National and University Library of Bosnia and Herzegovina
- National Gallery of Bosnia and Herzegovina
- National Museum of Bosnia and Herzegovina
- National Theatre
- Sarajevo Tunnel
- War Childhood Museum

== Historical sites of interest ==
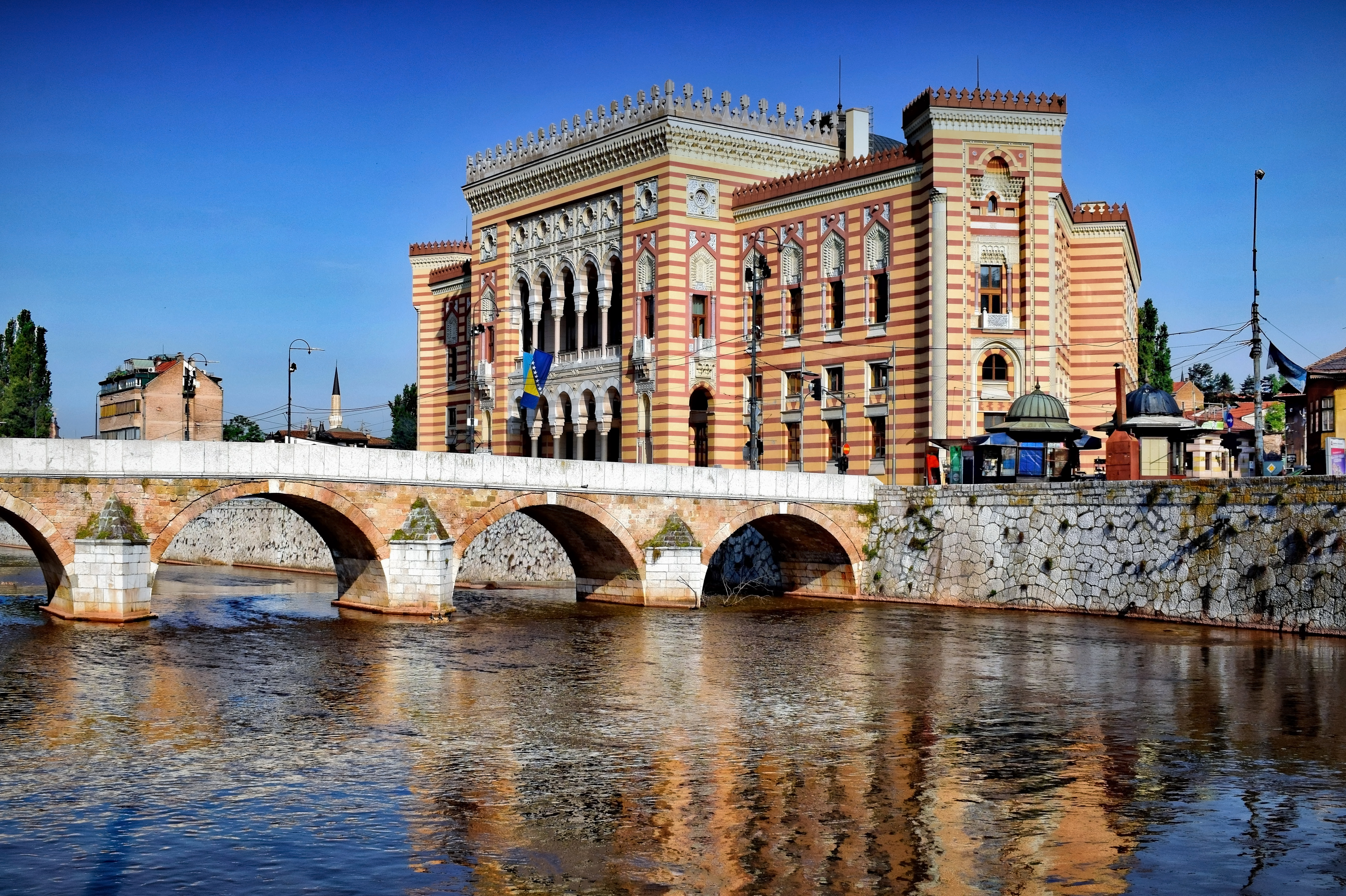
Vijećnica

- Baščaršija
- Bezistan
- Despić House
- Gazi Husrev-beg Library
- Gazi Husrev-beg Mosque
- Hotel Europe
- Marijin Dvor
- Morića Han
- Presidency Building
- Sarajevo Clock Tower
- Sebilj
- Svrzo's House
- Vijećnica
- White Fortress

== Bridges ==
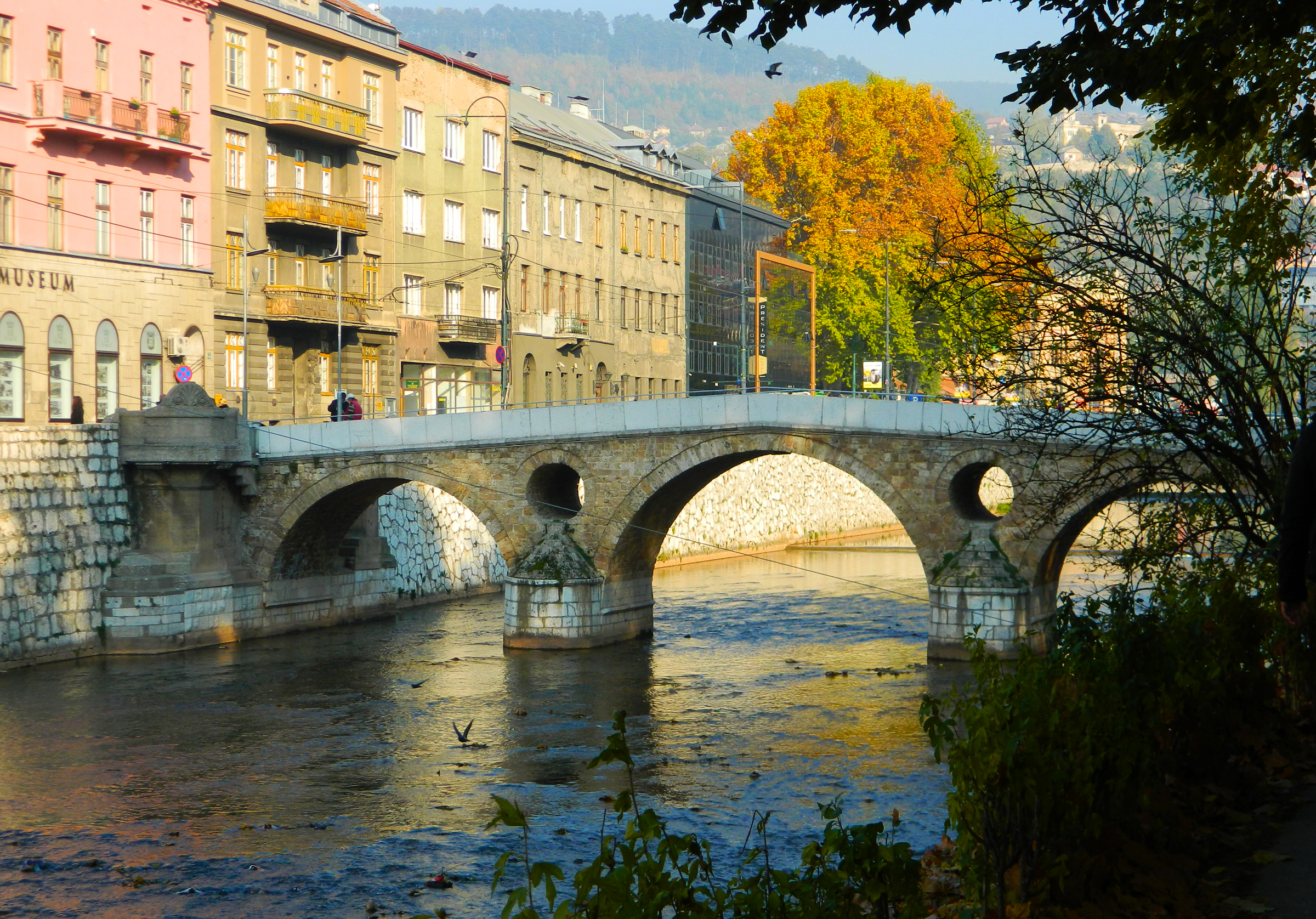
Latin Bridge

- Čobanija Bridge
- Ćumurija Bridge
- Drvenija Bridge
- Festina lente
- Goat's Bridge
- Latin Bridge
- Roman bridge
- Skenderija Bridge
- Šeher-Ćehaja Bridge

== Modern sites of interest ==
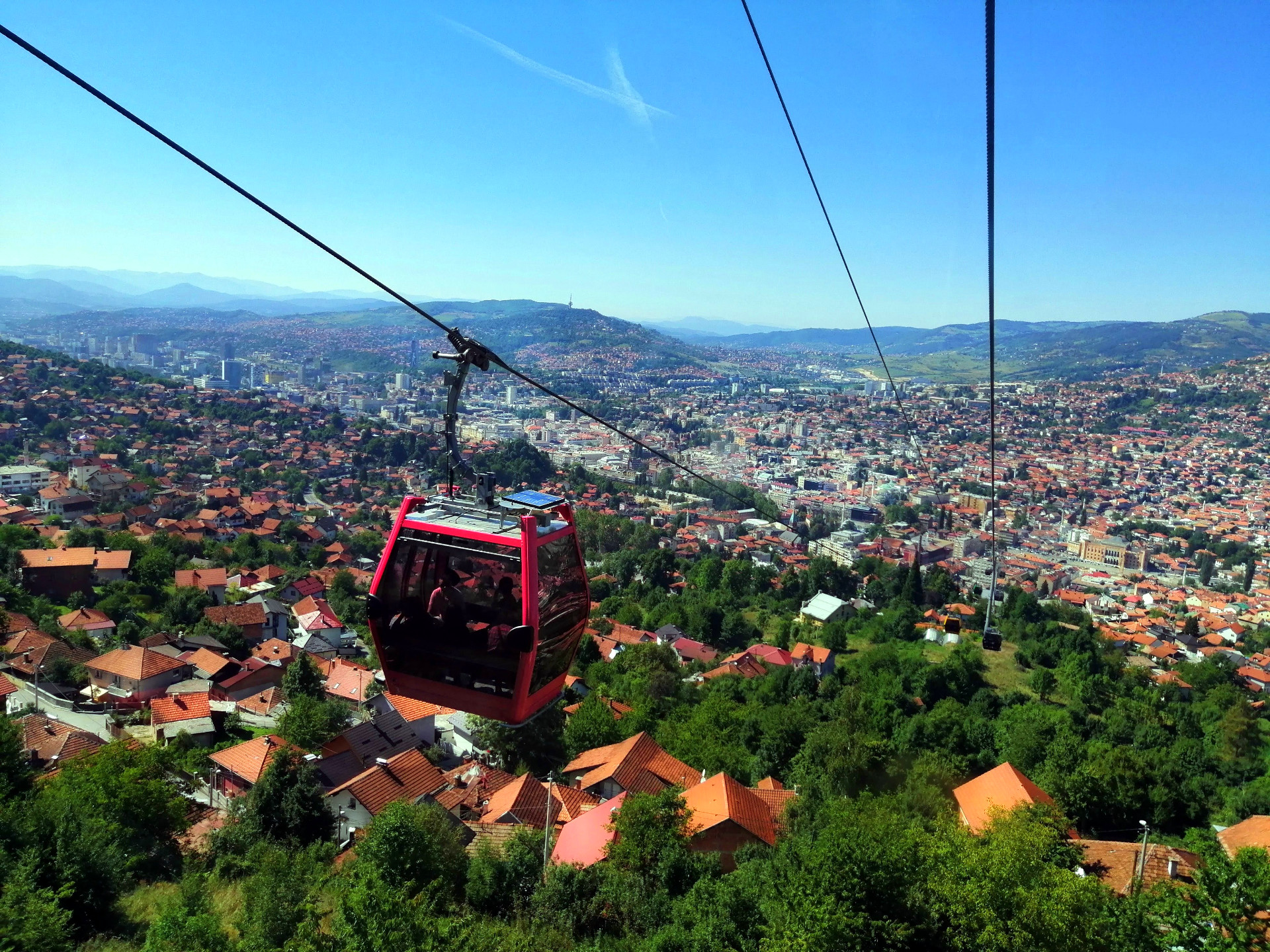
Sarajevo cable car

- ARIA Centar
- Avaz Twist Tower
- Bosmal City Center
- Koševo Olympic Stadium
- Sarajevo cable car
- Skenderija
- UNITIC World Trade Towers
- Zetra Olympic Hall

== Natural sites of interest ==
- Bjelašnica
- Igman
- Jahorina
- Trebević
- Miljacka river
- Vrelo Bosne

== Religious sites of interest ==
=== Islam ===
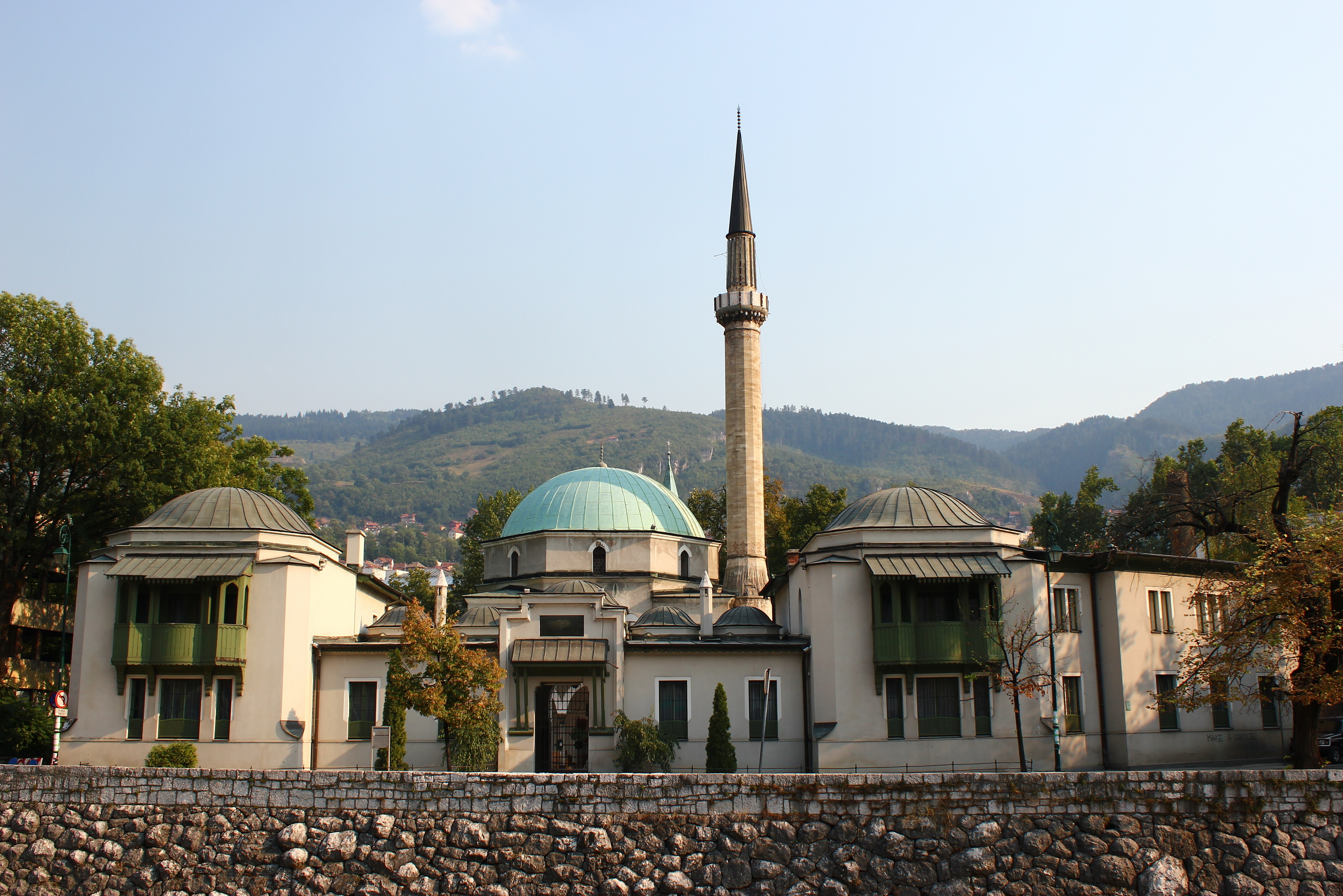
Emperor's Mosque

- Ali Pasha's Mosque
- Čobanija Mosque
- Emperor's Mosque
- Ferhadija Mosque
- Gazi Husrev-beg Mosque
- Hadžijska Mosque
- King Fahd Mosque
- Muslihudin Čekrekčija Mosque

=== Orthodox Christianity ===
- Cathedral of the Nativity of the Theotokos
- Church of the Holy Transfiguration
- Old Orthodox Church

=== Catholic Christianity ===
- Church of Saint Anthony of Padua
- Sacred Heart Cathedral
- Saint Joseph's Church

=== Judaism ===
- Sarajevo Synagogue

== Historical cemeteries ==
- Alifakovac Cemetery
- Bare Cemetery
- Kovači Cemetery
- Koševo Cemetery
- Lav Cemetery
- Old Jewish Cemetery
