= Lotika Zellermeier =

Lotika Zellermeier (Lotika Cilermajer) (1860 in Kraków, Poland – 1938 in Višegrad, Yugoslavia) was the inspiration for the main character from the 1961 Nobel Prize winner Ivo Andrić’s novel The Bridge on the Drina. She is the oldest of three sisters Zellermeier who moved, at the end of the 19th century, to Bosnia from Kraków, Poland.

== Biography ==
Little is known about Lotika's childhood and early adulthood. She was married to a doctor in Kraków but his identity is not known today. He died when Lotika was 19 years old. Soon after her husband's death, Lotika moved with her sisters to Višegrad, Bosnia and Herzegovina, then Austria-Hungary. At the same time two other Jewish families, Zaller and Apfelmeier, moved from Kraków to Višegrad. Their destinies will inseparably entwine in the coming years.

Even though she was widowed at such an early age, Lotika never remarried and had no descendants.

A bit more is known about Lotika's life after she moved to Bosnia. In Višegrad she worked as a manager of the Zur Brucke hotel, commonly known as Lotika’s Hotel among the locals. The owner of the hotel was the husband of her sister Debora, Adolf Zaller. While she was managing the hotel, one of the regulars was writer Ivo Andrić. The two of them built a close relationship over the years.

== Lotika and Ivo Andrić ==
Ivo Andrić has spent his childhood, youth and early adulthood in Višegrad and he enjoyed spending time in Lotika’s Hotel. Having established a close relationship with Lotika, he used her and her family as a basis for many of the characters in his novel The Bridge on the Drina. When he won the Nobel Prize for literature in 1961, 23 years after Lotika's death, her nieces Ina and Helena congratulated him in a letter. He kindly responded thanking them.

== Family ==
Lotika's sister Debora was married to Adolph Zaller, also mentioned in Andrić's novel. Their daughter Ina married Drago Maras, a doctor from Zagreb. They lived in Zagreb, Croatia, and had 1 son nicknamed "Gugo". Gugo was a doctor who lived in Quebec, Canada, until the end of his life.

The youngest sister, Adelaide, married Lavoslav Sperling, a businessman from Višegrad. They had five children, sons Samuel, a banker killed by Nazis in Vienna in 1941, Benjamin, a leather factory owner in Leipzig, also killed at the beginning of the Second World War, Ferdinand who was killed at the Sajmište concentration camp in Belgrade, Yugoslavia, and daughters Ana, who died of tuberculosis at an early age, and Serafina, the only child to survive the war. Serafina was the only child to survive the war because her husband's last name (Skarda) was not an obviously Jewish name. Serafina had 2 sons (Vladimir and Otokar) and 2 daughters (Adela and Helena) with Anton Skarda. Otokar was born in Sarajevo in 1915 and later moved to Sombor where he was a glovemaker and shop owner. He had two children with Eva Dvoracek, Helena and Anton. Helena's 2 daughters now live in Toronto, Canada with their families. Anton's son lives in Sombor with his family.

== Lotika today ==
Film director Emir Kusturica owns a traditional coffee shop Lotika on the grounds of the Mokra Gora National Park in Serbia. His business enterprise also bears Lotika's name (Lotika d.o.o). Belgrade TV station B92 has kept those facts in the focus of the Serbian public.

As a beneficiary of the funds granted by the Serbian Ministry of Culture, Kusturica is working on the opera The Bridge on the Drina.
