= Prosveta Publishing House =

Prosveta Publishing House was established within the Ministry of People’s Education on 15 February 1945 by a Decree of the Regents of Bulgaria with the purpose of “publishing textbooks, teaching aids, notebooks, and drawing pads for all academic subjects in all types of schools and academic institutions. According to statistics, Prosveta has published and circulated the works of over 50,000 authors and 28,000 titles in 788 series in more than two billion copies. Prosveta Publishing House is a member of the EEPG (European Educational Publishers Group).

== Today ==
Over 1,800 books in print are included in the catalogue of Prosveta Publishing House: textbooks, teaching aids, teacher’s books, and multimedia for all subjects and school levels; educational picture books for children aged between two and six and for children in the pre-school group; a wide range of instruction, reference, science, and fiction publications. All the textbooks and supplementary materials fully meet the National Educational Content Requirements. Scholarly research done by leading authors in “Culture”, “New Bulgarian Criticism”, and “Personal Choice” series has achieved recognition in academic circles.

Prosveta Publishing House has information centres in all major regional cities in the country. These centres provide teachers with information on new titles, maintain direct contact with schools, and hold meetings with regular pedagogical circles, thus meeting the specific needs of the educational process.

The library contains about 40,000 volumes.

== Prosveta Publishing House offers ==
-New textbooks and materials for all subjects and new coursebooks for foreign language teaching.

-Modern pedagogical and teaching methods; innovative educational and school management practices for teachers, headmasters, parents and students of all age groups and types of schools.

-Extensive information about the wide range of academic editions (1-12th grade) and the projects of Prosveta Publishing House online.

== Management ==
Prosveta has four editorial departments:

- Humanitarian Sciences and Arts
- Mathematics and Science
- Foreign language teaching
- Vocational training

and five administrative and technical units:

- Preprint Production Department
- Financial and Accounting Department
- Realisation Department
- Marketing and National Coordination Network Department
- Publishing and Artistic Council

all run by the Council of Directors.

== Partners and projects ==
Prosveta Publishing House maintains direct contact with municipalities and different types of schools in the country, with university circles, libraries, professional communities, and other publishing houses.

In 2007, Prosveta – Sofia Foundation was set up within the publishing house with the purpose of promoting the professional development of teachers, stimulating multicultural education, and supporting gifted students. Prosveta Publishing House works in close cooperation with the following European publishing houses:

- France – Hachette, Nathan, Belin, Didier
- Germany – Klett, Cornelsen Verlag, Gerstenberg
- UK – Cambridge University Press
- Russia – Prosveshcheniye
- Spain – Parramón Ediciones
- Croatia – Shkolska knjiga
- Austria – Veritas
- North Macedonia – Prosvetno delo
