= Iva Despić-Simonović =

Yugoslav sculptor (1891–1961)

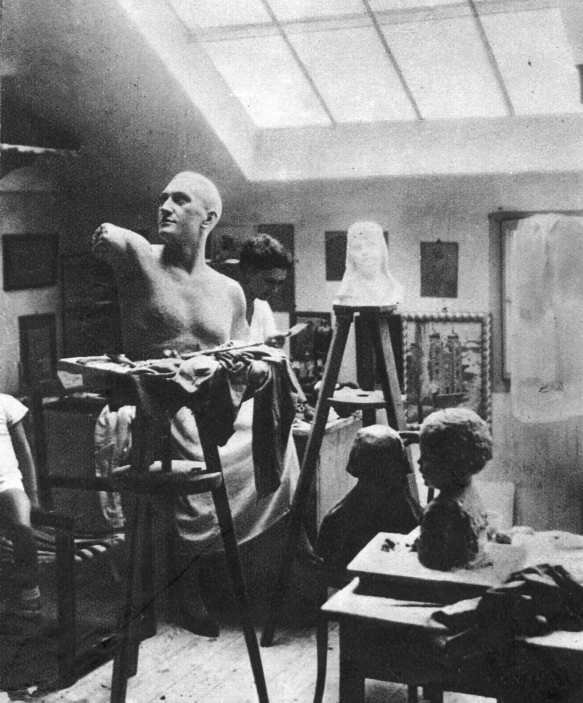
Despić-Simonović in her atelier in 1926

Ivana "Iva" Despić (née Simonović; Serbian Cyrillic: Ивана "Ива" Деспић, née Симоновић; 15 August 1891 – 12 July 1961) was a Yugoslav sculptor. Born in Croatia, Despić-Simonović was educated in Zagreb, Paris and Munich. From 1920 until her death she lived mostly in Sarajevo, but also served as the court sculptor in Belgrade. She was the first sculptor in modern-day Bosnia and Herzegovina and the only one in the interwar period, but faded into obscurity after the World War II.

== Education and family ==
Iva Simonović was born in Hrastovica near Petrinja in Croatia-Slavonia, Austria-Hungary, on 15 August 1891. (Note: The date 18 April 1890 is sometimes stated as well, but is not correct.) The Simonović family were wealthy. Her father, a general in the Austro-Hungarian Army, recognized her talent and provided her with an art education. She was trained by the sculptors Robert Frangeš-Mihanović and Rudolf Valdec. Her first exhibition, part of the solo exhibition of her peer Ljubo Babić, took place when she was still a student. Babić was interested in her romantically and painted a portrait of her. Iva Simonović continued her education in Paris and Munich, training as a plaquette and medallion artist, and had an exhibition in Paris in 1914.

Iva Despić-Simonović was married twice. Her first marriage, to Aleksandar Zarevski, was annulled. She met Aleksandar "Aco" Despić in Zagreb towards the end of the First World War, which was followed by the creation of Yugoslavia. The couple married in 1920, and Despić-Simonović moved to her husband's hometown of Sarajevo. They had a daughter, Gospava "Cica", and a son, Bato. Her in-laws, the Despić family, were prominent and wealthy merchants, and she felt repressed by their patriarchal attitude. This is reflected by a self-portrait bust named Constrained, now housed in the National Gallery of Bosnia and Herzegovina. Despić-Simonović longed for a space of her own. By 1931, the demand for her artwork had grown so much that she could afford to have a summer house built for herself in Vasin Han near Sarajevo. Moving too early into the still damp building, she caught a chronic illness that plagued her for years.

== Career ==
Despić-Simonović had two solo exhibitions, in London and Belgrade in 1927, receiving favorable criticism. She took part in collective exhibitions in London, Belgrade, Barcelona, Zagreb, Ljubljana, Prague, Brno and Bratislava. Her international success brought her fame in Yugoslavia as well, to the point of being contacted by King Alexander. She had a personal atelier at the royal court in Belgrade, where she portrayed high-ranking people. Despić-Simonović recalled that her skill became the talk of the court when Crown Prince Peter, then a toddler, came into her atelier and recognized the bust she was working on as depicting General Stevan Hadžić. She was made court sculptor as well as the sculpting instructor of Queen Maria, with whom she became particularly close.

During her sojourn in Belgrade, Despić-Simonović portrayed the King, the Queen, generals, and other high-ranking people, including King Ferdinand of Romania and Prince Kiril of Bulgaria. Other well-known works include the sculptures Children in the Snow (1923), Good Friends (1923), and Bato is Playing (1925), as well as the plaque Consolation (1927). In her early career, Despić-Simonović was influenced by the ideals of early Renaissance, but later adopted an impressionist approach.

Despić-Simonović was the first sculptor in modern-day Bosnia and Herzegovina, and remained the only one throughout the interwar period. Bosnian women at that time were mostly illiterate and took no part in public life, but Despić-Simonović's career flourished and she was well known in society. In a 1937 interview, she complained about the treatment of women artists, saying: "I am under impression that male artists do not value the artistic work of women. They have it easy ... When a male artist's child is ill, he keeps doing his job. When my daughter had typhus, I did not care about sculpting." Despić-Simonović was inspired by motherhood and frequently portrayed her children. She was particularly keen to make a monument to mothers, similar to the Tomb of the Unknown Soldier, which was becoming widespread across the world. Her idea was not supported, and she claimed that it was copied and later realized in the United States.

== Later life ==
During the Second World War, Despić-Simonović stayed on her estate near Sarajevo. Wartime scarcity forced her to buy a cow to support the family. According to her daughter, the family had to hide the cow from soldiers in her atelier, and the distressed animal damaged a number of sculptures.

The Communist Party took power following the war and the monarchy was abolished. As a supporter of the exiled royal family, Despić-Simonović was arrested in June 1945 and spent some time imprisoned in Sarajevo. A portrait she made at that time of another prisoner, the actor Ante Franjković "Dalmata", has been preserved. She was released soon, but her life changed. She was shunned and found little work, devoting increasingly more time to painting and drawing and less to sculpting. Her most notable works following the Second World War are the busts of poets Aleksa Šantić, Svetozar Ćorović and Osman Đikić, ordered by the authorities of Mostar.

Despić-Simonović died on 12 July 1961 in her atelier in Vasin Han. Plans to protect her home and turn it into an artists' colony surfaced a few years after her death but were never realized. The house was restored in 2005 by a new owner, and at that time a number of previously unknown plaster busts were found behind hidden basement doors.
