= Latin Bridge =

Ottoman stone-arch bridge over Miljacka in Sarajevo, Bosnia and Herzegovina

Latin Bridge Latinska ćuprija
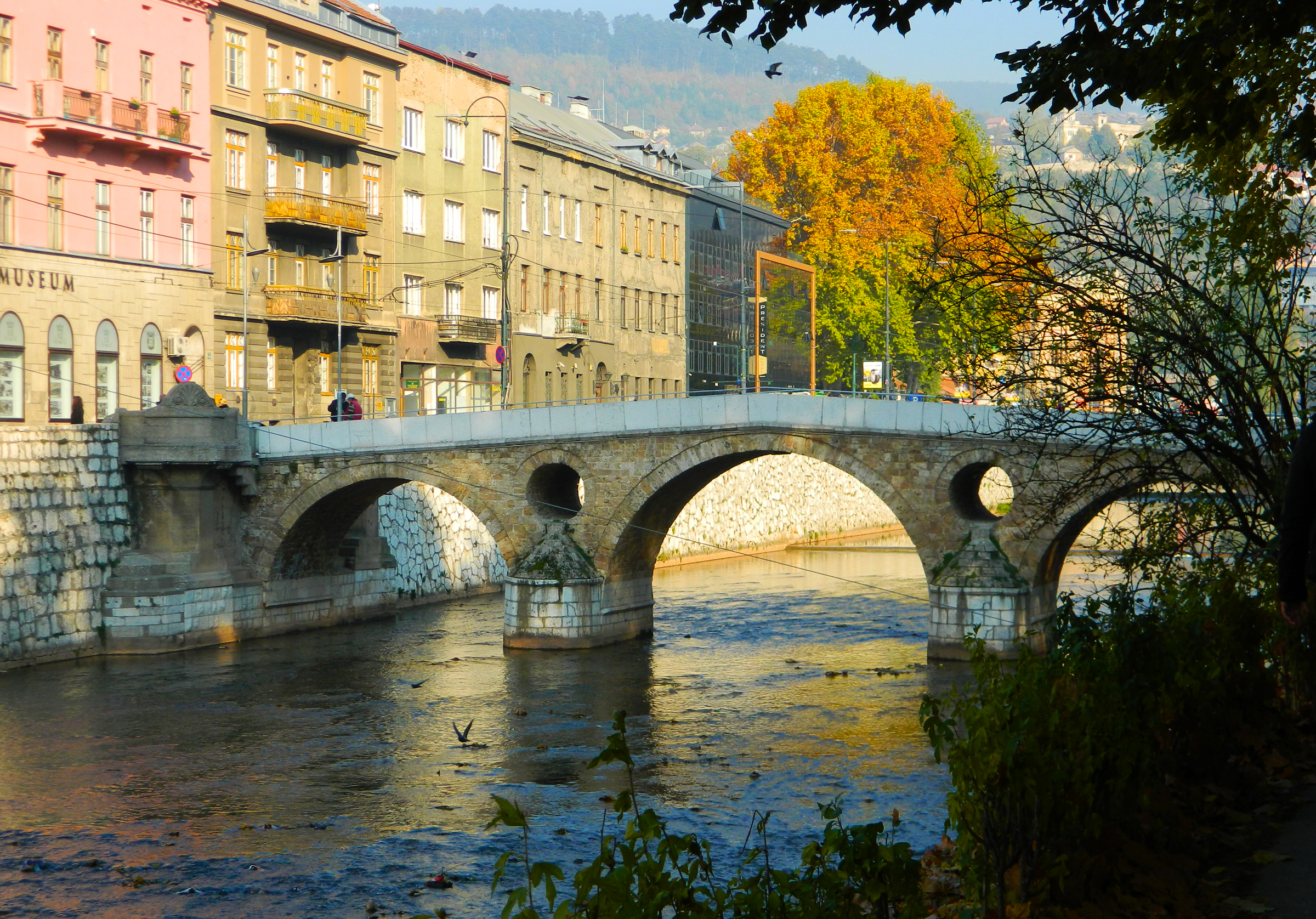
- Latin Bridge in 2015
- Coordinates: 43°51′28″N 18°25′44″E
- Carries: Pedestrians and bicycles
- Crosses: Miljacka
- Other name: Principov most

Characteristics
- Material: Stone
- Trough construction: Gypsum

Location
- Interactive map of Latin Bridge

Latin Bridge (Serbo-Croatian: Latinska ćuprija, Латинска ћуприја named Principov most / Принципов мост – "Princip's Bridge" during the Yugoslav era) is an Ottoman-era bridge over the river Miljacka in Sarajevo, Bosnia and Herzegovina.

The northern end of the bridge was the site of the assassination of Archduke Franz Ferdinand of Austria by Gavrilo Princip in 1914, which began the July Crisis that ultimately led to the outbreak of World War I.

== History ==
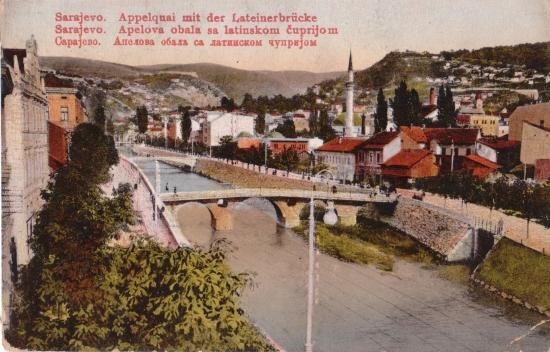
Latin Bridge in 1913

The bridge received its name because it connected the right bank of the Miljacka with the Catholic quarter of the city, which was informally called "Latinluk" ("place/domain of the Latins", loosely "Latin Quarter") in Ottoman times. Judging by its foundations, it is the oldest among the preserved bridges in the city. The census of the Sanjak of Bosnia from 1541 mentions the bridge on this spot, built by the leather-worker Hussein, son of Sirmerd. This first bridge seems to have been made of wood, because the court record from 1565 witness that the stone bridge was built here by eminent citizen of Sarajevo Ali Ajni-Beg.

A terrible flood on 15 November 1791 badly damaged the bridge and its reconstruction was financed by the Sarajevo merchant Abdulah-aga Briga. Someone worked out that the year when it was rebuilt can be obtained from the numerical values in the word 'Briga' – it is 1213, which by Islamic calendar equals the year of the reconstruction 1798/99.

The bridge has four arches and rests on three strong pillars and the embankment; it is built of stone and gypsum and the two relieving openings, 'eyes' in the mass above pillars are so characteristic that they can be seen in the seal of Sarajevo. Because of heavy traffic at the time of Austria-Hungary, the pavements on consoles were added to the bridge.

During the Yugoslav era, the bridge was known as Principov most / Принципов мост – "Princip's Bridge".

== Assassination ==
A map of where the Archduke was killed in relation to the bridge

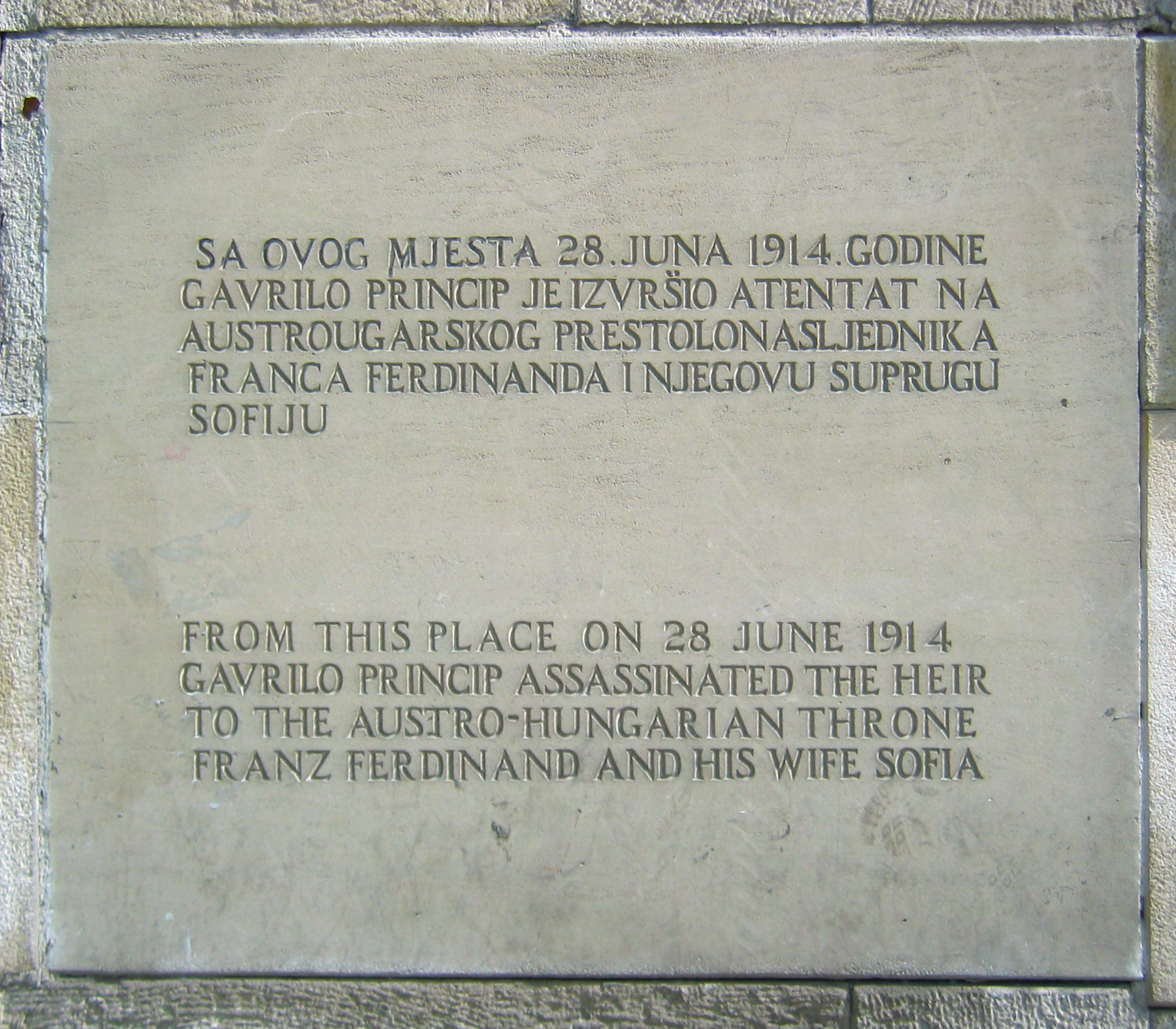
A plaque commemorating the location of the Sarajevo assassination. The tone of language used is different from the Yugoslav-era one

On 28 June 1914, at the turning from the Right Bank into a street, Gavrilo Princip shot and killed Franz Ferdinand, heir presumptive to the Austro-Hungarian throne. This was the immediate cause for the beginning of the First World War. The bridge was renamed Princip during the Yugoslavian era. The name returned to the Latin Bridge after the Yugoslav Wars.

=== Princip's testimony ===
At the judicial hearing on 12 October 1914, Princip described the site of the shooting during his interrogation, specifically mentioning the bridge. The text reads:

Prosecution: Did you know that there was a Muslim?

Accused: I knew, but he didn't tell me. I saw him one evening. On the day of the assassination I wanted to find someone who would not be conspicuous, and I found the son of the prosecutor, Svara, and one Spiric. First I walked with Spiric. Then we invited Svara and we walked and talked about ordinary things. At first we were in the park and I wanted to stay there, but they wanted to go to the Korso (a promenade). I didn't want to stay there because I had to go to my place. So I returned there and I walked on the quay and I was at my assigned place. The automobile arrived and I heard the blast of a bomb. I knew that that was one of ours, but I didn't know which one. The mob started to run, and I ran a little too and the automobile stopped. I thought that it was over and I saw that they had Cabrinovic. I thought that I would kill him so that no one would know anything further, and then kill myself, too. I abandoned that idea, because I saw that the automobiles passed by. Up to then I had not seen the Archduke. I went to the Latin Bridge and then I heard that the assassination had not succeeded. Then I took thought as to where to stand, because I knew where he would pass from having read it in the Bosanska Posta (Bosnian Post) and the Tagblatt. Then I saw that a lady was sitting with him, but because they passed so fast I did not know whether she was sitting. Then I stood and one Pusar came up to me and touched my shoulder and said, "Do you see how dumb they are?" I was silent. He called me aside and because I thought he was a spy I thought that he wanted to get something out of me. A relative of his is a spy, so I thought that he was too. I don't know whether or not he was near me, but then the automobile came and I took out the revolver and I shot at Ferdinand twice from the distance of four or five paces.

== See also ==
- List of tourist attractions in Sarajevo
