= Vladislav Skarić =

Bosnian historian and educator

- Born: June 10, 1869; Sarajevo, Ottoman Empire
- Died: August 6, 1943 (aged 74); Sarajevo, Independent State of Croatia
- Occupations: Historian, Educator, Museum director
- Known for: Studies on Ottoman Bosnia, Director of the National Museum of Bosnia and Herzegovina
- Notable work: Popis bosanskih spahija iz 1711. godine, Sarajevo i njegova okolina
- Awards: Order of St. Sava (1924), Order of the White Eagle (1929)

Vladislav Skarić (10 June 1869 – 6 August 1943) was a Bosnian historian, educator, and cultural worker, recognized as one of the most prominent historians of Bosnia and Herzegovina in the early 20th century. He significantly contributed to the study of the Ottoman period in Bosnia and Herzegovina and was instrumental in preserving the cultural heritage of Sarajevo.

== Early life and education ==
Skarić was born in Sarajevo during Ottoman rule into a prominent Serbian family. His father, Kosta, was a wealthy merchant, and the family lived in one of the most luxurious houses in Sarajevo at the time, located near today's Hotel Europe. That house now hosts the Museum of Literature and Theater Arts of Bosnia and Herzegovina.

He began his education at the Serbian Church Municipality school in Sarajevo, studying under esteemed teachers such as Stevo Sarajčić and Filip Špadijer. He later attended the Serbian Gymnasium and then the Austro-Hungarian State Gymnasium. Due to his outspoken views, he was expelled and completed his secondary education in Sremski Karlovci in 1890. He studied History and Geography at the University of Graz.

== Career ==
After completing his studies, Skarić worked as a teacher in secondary schools in Banja Luka and Sarajevo. He was one of the founders of the Serbian Cultural and Educational Society "Prosvjeta" and contributed to the magazine Bosanska vila. Following the assassination in Sarajevo in 1914, Austro-Hungarian authorities arrested him along with many other Serbs, and he spent World War I in captivity.

In 1919, he became a curator at the National Museum of Bosnia and Herzegovina and served as its director from 1926 to 1936. He published his most significant works in the museum's journal Glasnik Zemaljskog muzeja Bosne i Hercegovine. In 1939, together with Đoko Mazalić and Darinka Despić, he opened a new permanent exhibition at the Museum of the Old Orthodox Church in Sarajevo located in Baščaršija.

== Contributions and legacy ==
Skarić's scholarly work covered various periods of Bosnian history, with a focus on the Ottoman era. He taught himself Ottoman Turkish to access original sources. His notable works include Popis bosanskih spahija iz 1711. godine, a monograph on Sarajevo, and studies on Mula Mustafa Bašeskija, Trebinje, the origins of the Orthodox population in Bosnia and Herzegovina, as well as medieval mining laws and techniques in Serbia and Bosnia.

He was a member of the Serbian Royal Academy and received multiple honors, including the Order of St. Sava in 1924 and the Order of the White Eagle in 1929.

He died on 6 August 1943 in Sarajevo. His legacy lives on through his extensive scholarly work and the institutions that continue to bear his name.

== Selected works ==
- Popis bosanskih spahija iz 1711. godine
- Sarajevo i njegova okolina od najstarijih vremena do austrougarske okupacije
- Srpski pravoslavni narod i crkva u Sarajevu u 17. i 18. vijeku
