= Silvije Strahimir Kranjčević =

Croatian poet (1856–1908)

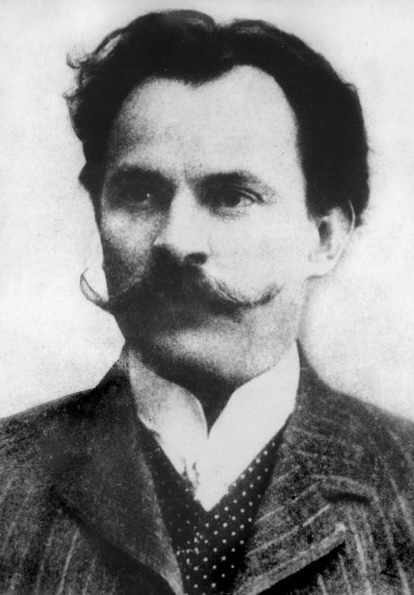
- Born: 17 February 1865; Senj, Kingdom of Croatia, Austrian Empire
- Died: 29 October 1908 (aged 43); Sarajevo, Condominium of Bosnia and Herzegovina, Austria-Hungary
- Occupations: writer; poet; translator; literary editor
- Known for: see Publications
- Spouse: Gabrijela Kašalj (m. 1897)

Silvije Strahimir Kranjčević (Croatian: [sîːlʋije strǎximir krǎːɲtʃeʋitɕ]; 17 February 1865 – 29 October 1908) was a Croatian poet, literary editor and translator, one of the central figures of realism in Croatian literature. As an editor of the Nada magazine, he was "the most distinctive cultural phenomenon in Sarajevo at the turn of the century" and published the world's first translation of the then-young Luigi Pirandello in that magazine. His most notable work was Bugarkinje, a book of poetry published in 1885 that explores the themes of Homeland, Man, and Universe.

== Biography ==
Kranjčević was born in Senj on 17 February 1865, to father Spiridion and mother Marija. As a teenager, he attended secondary school at a gymnasium but did not graduate. He joined the Germanico-Hungaricum Institute in Rome, with the intention to become a priest, but he eventually changed his mind. His short stay in Rome would be alluded to in his poetry years later.

He attended a one-year course for language and history teachers in Zagreb. After obtaining a diploma as a teacher in "citizen schools", he moved to work in Bosnia and Herzegovina. He taught in Mostar, Livno, Bijeljina, and Sarajevo.

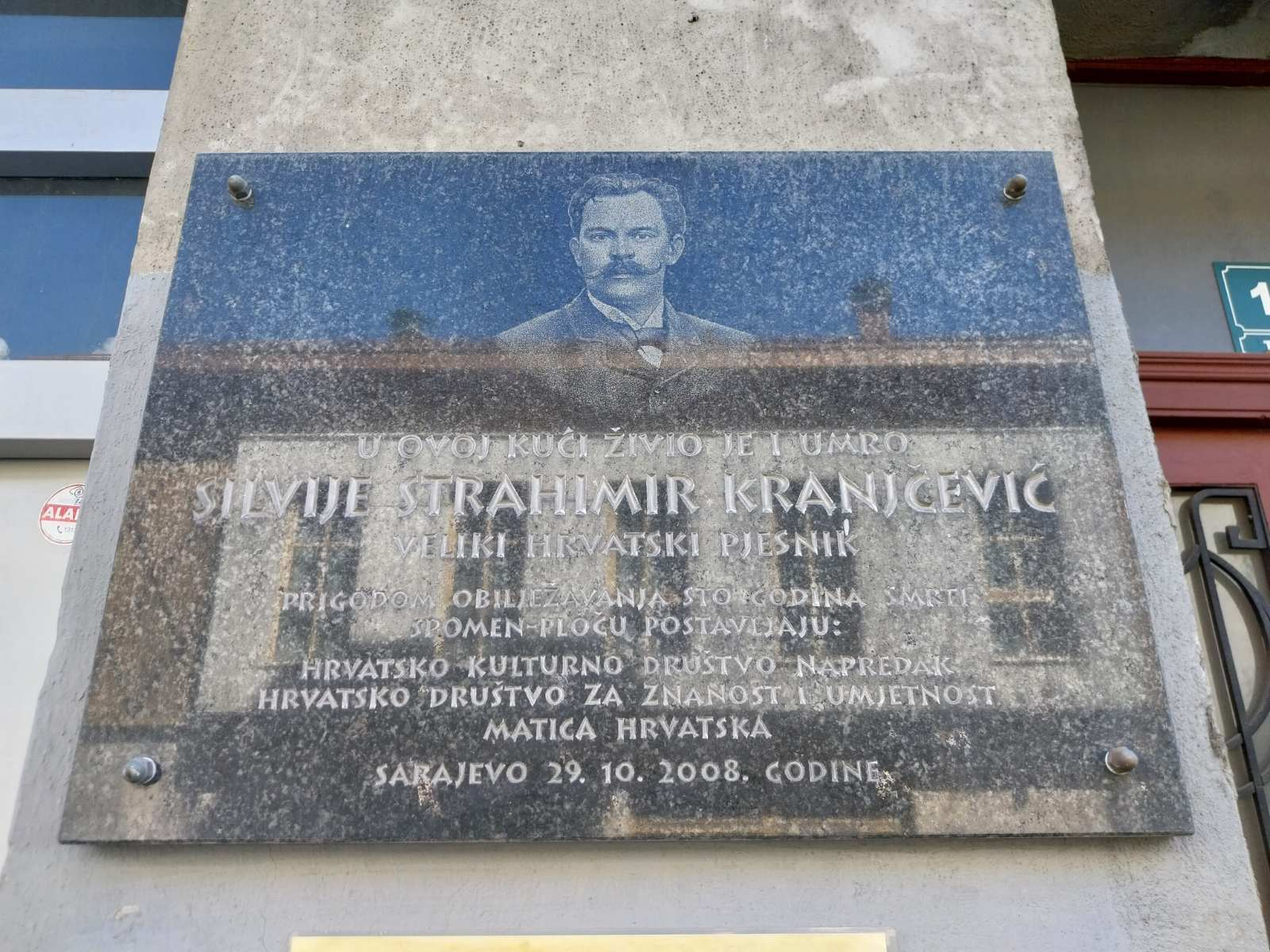
Memorial Plaque dedicated to Kranjčević on the wall of the building where he resided in Sarajevo

Kranjčević's first poem, Zavjet (The Pledge), was published a couple of months before he left for Rome in 1883 in the magazine Hrvatska vila. He sent two more poems from Rome in 1884, Pozdrav (Salutations) and Senju-gradu (To the City of Senj), to Sloboda, a magazine in Sušak. When he returned from Rome, he published Noć na Foru (A Night at the Forum) in Vienac.

In Sarajevo, he was the editor of Nada, a literary magazine published by the Bosnian government, for eight years (1895–1903). The nominal editor was the government adviser Kosta Hörmann, the benefactor of Antun Gustav Matoš. The magazine was associated with the Croatian pre-modernist movement, Moderna. It was there that Kranjčević published most of his literary essays and criticisms.

Silvije Strahimir Kranjčević died in Sarajevo, 1908. He was buried at St. Joseph Cemetery in Sarajevo.

== Works ==
Kranjčević published his first poetry book, Bugarkinje, in 1885. Titled after a genre of traditional elegiac Croatian folk songs, the work primarily explored three central themes: Homeland, Man, and Universe. The first criticism of the book was written by the classical philologist and literary critic Milivoj Šrepel in Vijenac. Šrepel noted Kranjčević's "vivid imagination" and "true poetic enthusiasm", but deplored the uneven quality of his poems. Nevertheless, he concluded that "a new and talented hand has appeared in the Croatian Parnassus".

Later literary figures also commented on Bugarkinje. The writer Miroslav Krleža said they presented Kranjčević as a genuine "standard-bearer of freedom". Prophetic and bitter energy of its poems, although occasionally falling into pathos and rhetoric, embraced universal and cosmic themes, which made the young Kranjčević stand out among his contemporaries, such as August Harambašić, whose main themes were declamatory patriotism and romantic love.

Bugarkinje attempted to formulate a poetic and political program. The dedicatory poem to August Šenoa expressed Kranjčević's poetic credo, while poems dedicated to Croatia, the People, and the Worker represented key aspects of the poet's national and political beliefs.

Kranjčević incorporated parables from the Bible and classical mythology, as well as symbols from Christianity and Judaism. The allegorical nature of these references allowed him to address fundamental human issues through symbolism and metaphor.

His next poetry book, Selected Poems, was published more than a decade later, in 1898. It was followed by another book, Trzaji (Quivers), in 1902, and Pjesme (Poems), in 1908. A selection of prose works, Poetična proza (Poetic Prose), was published posthumously in 1912, and a critical edition, Sabrana djela (Collected Works), was published in 1967.

He translated from German and English, and his works have been translated into Bulgarian, Czech, Esperanto, French, Hungarian, Macedonian, German, Polish, Russian, Slovak, Slovene and Italian.

== Publications ==
=== Poetry ===
Kranjčević's poetic opus consists of 421 published poems. The majority were published in four poetry collections, while some were published posthumously in selected poems.

==== Poetry collections ====
Kranjčević's publications include;

- Bugarkinje (1885)
- Trzaji (1902)
- Pjesme [Poems] (1908)
- Poetična proza [Poetic prose] (1912)

=== Prose ===
His prose works were published posthumously in the collection Pjesnička proza (1912). Kranjčević's prose is not as significant as his poetry, and the short stories "Prvi honorar" (First Fee), "Žena" (Woman), "Tko će oslobodit narod...?" (Who Will Free the People...?), "Priča iz pradavnih dana" (A Tale from Ancient Days), and especially the oratorio Prvi grijeh (The first sin) which he wrote in 1893. The oratorio was set to music by Ivan Zajc in 1907.

=== Drama ===
Kranjčević left behind a manuscript draft and the first scenes of the current social drama Za drugoga (For Another), and based on that draft, at the request of his wife Gabrijela, Milan Ogrizović wrote a play that he offered to the Zagreb theater in 1910, but the censorship did not let it pass.

=== Selected and collected works ===
- Djela (Works), edited by Branimir Livadić, published by Minerva, Nakladna knjižara d. d. in Zagreb, 1933–1934.
  - Svezak I: Za narod, 1933.
  - Svezak II: Za čovjeka, 1934.
  - Svezak III: Pred vizijama, 1934.
  - Svezak IV: Kroz život i djelo, 1934.
- Sabrana djela (Collected Works), published by JAZU in Zagreb, 1958–1967. (considered as the canonical critical editions of Kranjčević's work)
  - Svezak I: Pjesme I, edited by Dragutin Tadijanović, 1958.
  - Svezak II: Pjesme II, edited by Dragutin Tadijanović, 1958.
  - Svezak III: Proza, edited by Ivo Frangeš, 1967.

== Reception ==
Kranjčević was accepted by the public early on and appreciated by his fellow writers, while literary criticism and historiography took time to recognize his significance. However, since the 2nd half of the 20th century, no other Croatian literary great, apart from Miroslav Krleža and Ivo Andrić, has had that monographs written about him. There is even term for the study of his work – kranjčevićologija ('Kranjčevićology').

When the 50th anniversary of Kranjčević's death was being celebrated in 1958, literary historian Ivo Frangeš wrote: "To speak about Kranjčević's poetry fifty years after the poet's death means inevitably raising our voice and revealing not only the real value of that poetry but also our debt to it."

== Legacy ==
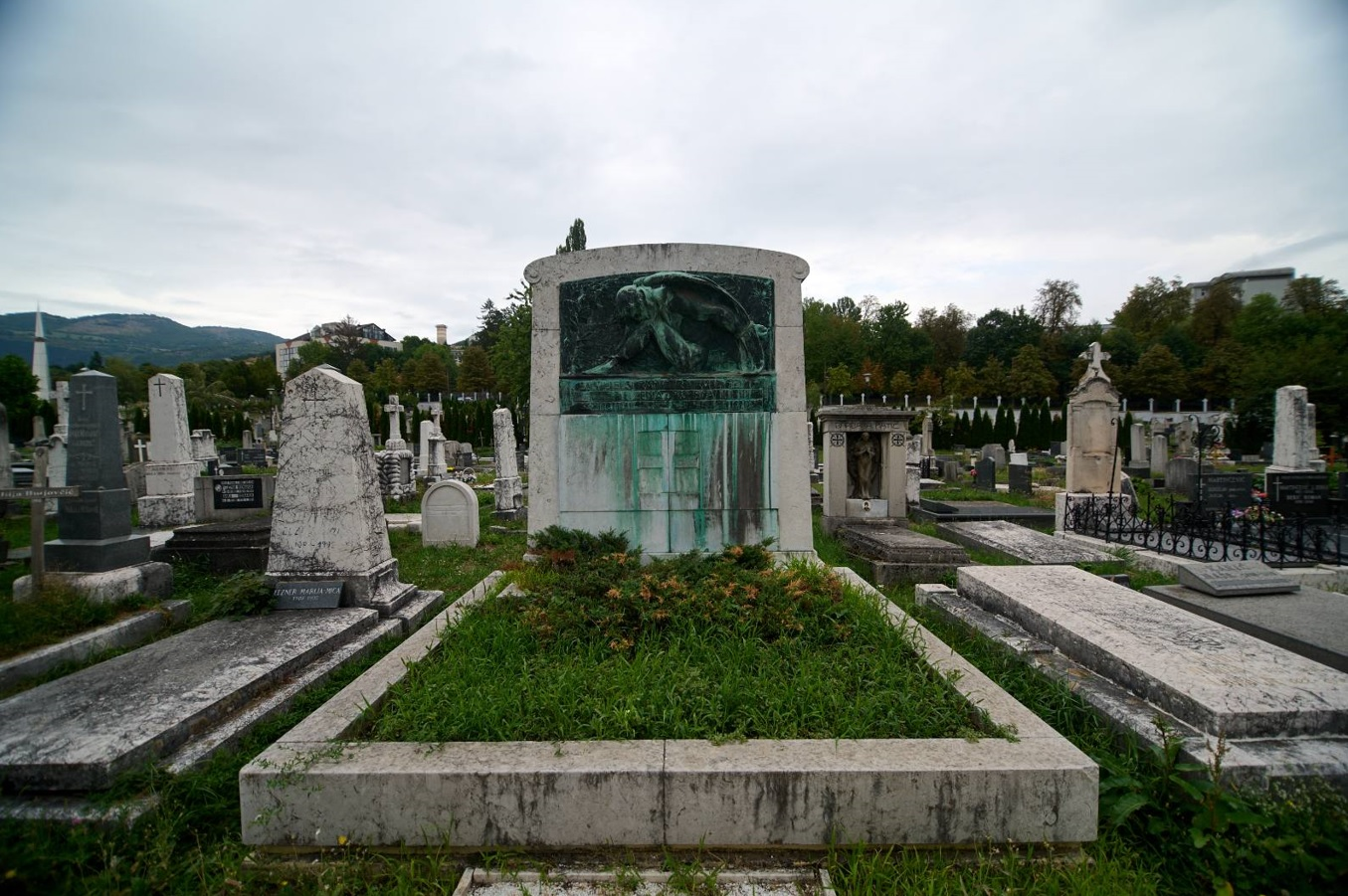
Kranjević's grave in Sarajevo

The Museum of Literature and Theater Arts of Bosnia and Herzegovina in Sarajevo houses his memorial room with most of his literary legacy. Parts of his legacy are also kept in the Institute for the History of Croatian Literature, Theatre and Music of the Croatian Academy of Sciences and Arts and in the National and University Library in Zagreb. His digitalized legacy has been published on the Internet by the CARNET.

Exhibitions about him were organized in Zagreb in 1958. at the Institute of Literature of the Croatian Academy of Sciences and Arts and in Sarajevo in 1988. at the MKKU.

A portrait mask (Ivan Meštrović, 1907), a sketch for a monument (Ivan Kožarić, 1959), and portrait sculptures (Vanja Radauš, 1961; Zvonimir Kamenar, 1978) were made in his image.

In Zagreb, a monument was erected in front of the Faculty of Philosophy (Tomislav Ostoja, 1962) and a bust was placed in front of the elementary school in Bogišićeva Street (Ksenija Kantoci). His portraits in oil were painted by Bela Čikoš Sesija (1908) and Miljenko Stančić (1961).

Croatian Post released a postage stamp in his honour in 2008, as a part of the series 'Notable Croats' (Znameniti Hrvati).

== Literature ==
=== Entries ===
- Jelčić, Dubravko; Tkalčević, Mladena (2013). "Kranjčević, Silvije Strahimir". Croatian Biographical Lexicon (HBL) (in Croatian). Miroslav Krleža Institute of Lexicography.
- "Kranjčević, Silvije Strahimir". Croatian Encyclopedia (in Croatian). Miroslav Krleža Institute of Lexicography. 30 August 2023.

=== Books ===
- Jelčić, Dubravko (1984). Kranjčević. Biblioteka Portreti (in Croatian). Zagreb: Globus.
- Jelčić, Dubravko (2004). Povijest hrvatske književnosti: tisućljeće od Baščanske ploče do postmoderne [History of Croatian literature: A millennium from the Baška Tablet to postmodernism]. Biblioteka hrvatske povijesti (in Croatian) (2nd ed.). Zagreb: Naklada Pavičić. ISBN 978-953-6308-56-9.
- Lovrenović, Ivan (2002). Bosanski Hrvati: Esej o agoniji jedne evropsko-orijentalne mikrokulture [Bosnian Croats: an essay on the agony of a European-Oriental microculture] (in Croatian). Zagreb: Durieux. ISBN 953-188-152-9.

=== Articles ===
- Mušović, Nedim (2006). "Spomen-soba Silvija Strahimira Kranjčevića" [The Silvije Strahimir Kranjčević Collection]. Muzeologija (in Croatian). 43/44: 275-287.
- Nemec, Krešimir (24 June 2015). "Kapitalno djelo o Kranjčeviću" [Capital work on Kranjčević]. Vijenac (in Croatian). No. 556. Zagreb: Matica hrvatska.
- Šrepel, Milivoj (1885). "Bugarkinje". Vijenac (in Croatian). XVII (33): 522–525., cited in "Bugarkinje". Vijenac (in Croatian). No. 556. 24 June 2015.
