= The Bridge on the Drina =

Historical novel by the writer Ivo Andrić

- First edition cover
- Author: Ivo Andrić
- Original title: Na Drini ćuprija
- Language: Serbo-Croatian
- Genre: Historical fiction
- Publisher: Prosveta
- Publication date: March 1945
- Publication place: Yugoslavia
- Pages: 318

The Bridge on the Drina (Note: Serbo-Croatian: Na Drini ćuprija, На Дрини ћуприја (pronounced [na drǐːni tɕǔprija])) is a historical novel by the Yugoslav writer Ivo Andrić. It revolves around the Mehmed Paša Sokolović Bridge in Višegrad, which spans the Drina River and stands as a silent witness to history from its construction by the Ottomans in the mid-16th century until its partial destruction during World War I. The story spans about four centuries and covers the Ottoman and Austro-Hungarian occupations of the region, with a particular emphasis on the lives, destinies, and relations of the local inhabitants, especially Serbs and Bosnian Muslims.

Andrić had been Yugoslavia's ambassador to Germany from 1939 to 1941, during the early years of World War II, and was arrested by the Germans in April 1941, following the German-led Axis invasion of Yugoslavia. In June 1941, he was allowed to return to German-occupied Belgrade but was confined to a friend's apartment in conditions that some biographers liken to house arrest. The novel was one of three that Andrić wrote over the next several years. All three were published in short succession in 1945, following Belgrade's liberation from the Germans. The Bridge on the Drina was published in March of that year to widespread acclaim.

In 1961, Andrić was awarded the Nobel Prize in Literature and his works became subject to international recognition, while at the same time, he expressed a desire for the original manuscript to be donated to the city of Sarajevo, where the Museum of Literature was established. The Bridge on the Drina remains Andrić's best-known work. The Serbian filmmaker Emir Kusturica is planning a cinematic adaption of the novel, for which he has constructed a mock-town named after Andrić not far from the bridge, which was reconstructed after World War I and has been declared a National Monument of Bosnia and Herzegovina by KONS and World Heritage Site by UNESCO.

== Summary ==
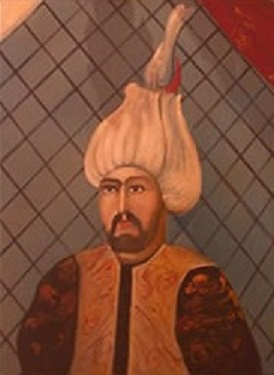
Mehmed-paša Sokolović

A young Serb boy from the vicinity of Višegrad is taken from his mother by the Ottomans as part of the devşirme levy, one of many Christian boys to experience this fate during the Ottoman Empire's 500-year-long occupation of the Balkans. The boy's mother follows her son wailing until she reaches the Drina River, where he is taken across by ferry and she can no longer follow. The young boy is converted to Islam and assigned the Turkish name of Mehmed, becoming known as Mehmed-paša Sokolović. He rises through the Ottoman military ranks and around the age of 60 becomes the Grand Vizier, a position he holds for the next fifteen years. During his time as Grand Vizier, he serves under three sultans and oversees the Ottoman Empire's expansion into Central Europe. He remains haunted by the memory of being forcibly taken from his mother and orders the construction of a bridge at the part of the river where the two became separated.

Construction begins in 1566, and five years later the bridge is completed, together with a caravanserai (or han). The bridge replaces the unreliable ferry transport that was once the only means of traversing the river and comes to represent an important link between the Bosnia Eyalet and the rest of the Ottoman Empire. The bridge is built by serfs, who intermittently stage strikes and sabotage the construction site in protest against the poor working conditions. The Ottomans respond harshly, impaling the one caught saboteur. The bridge is wider across the middle portion, known as the gate (or kapija), and this section becomes a popular meeting place. Every important moment in the lives of the local residents comes to revolve around the bridge, with Christian children crossing it to be baptized on the opposite bank, and children of all religions playing around it. As time progresses, legends develop around the history of the bridge. The locals tell of two Christian infants who were buried alive inside the bridge to placate the fairies (vile) that thwart its construction. They come to regard two holes on the side of the bridge as places where the infants' mothers would come to suckle them while they were entombed. About a century later, the Habsburg monarchy reclaims much of Central Europe and the northern Balkans from the Ottomans, triggering a crisis within the empire. Due to lack of state funds, the caravanserai is abandoned and falls into disuse. The bridge, on the other hand, stands for centuries without maintenance because of how well it was constructed. The residents of Višegrad—Turks, Serbs, Sephardic Jews, and Roma—stand in solidarity with one another during the Drina's regular floods.

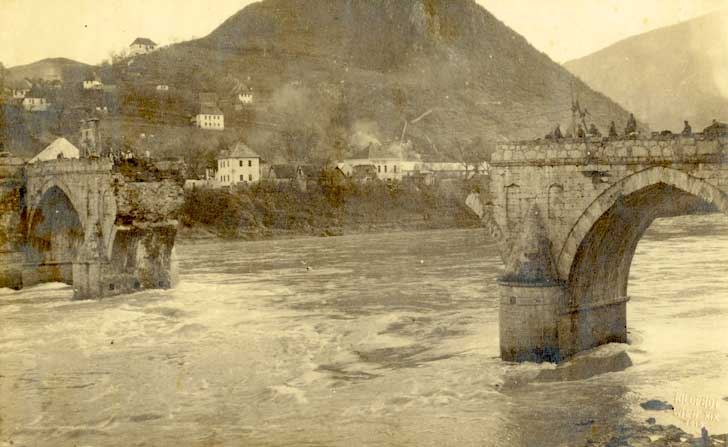
The partially destroyed Mehmed Paša Sokolović Bridge, 1915

The first nationalist tensions arise in the 19th century, with the outbreak of the First Serbian Uprising in present-day central Serbia. The Turks construct a blockhouse on the bridge, decorating it with stakes on which they pin the heads of suspected rebels. One evening, the blockhouse burns down. In the ensuing decades, as the Ottoman Empire continues to decline, Bosnia is ravaged by plague. After the Congress of Berlin in 1878, Serbia and Montenegro become fully independent countries. Austria-Hungary receives a right to occupy Bosnia-Herzegovina and turns it into a protectorate. The occupation comes as a shock to the residents of the town, which has remained largely unchanged since the time of the bridge's completion, and the local people experience difficulties accepting the numerous changes and reforms that accompany Austro-Hungarian rule. A barrack is built at the site of the caravanserai and the town experiences a substantial influx of foreigners. People from all parts of Austria-Hungary arrive, opening new businesses and bringing the customs of their native regions with them. A narrow gauge railway line is built to Sarajevo and the bridge loses much of its strategic importance. Local children begin to be educated in Sarajevo, and some go on to continue their studies in Vienna. They bring home new social and cultural ideas from abroad, among them the concepts of trade unions and socialism, while newly established newspapers acquaint the town's inhabitants with nationalism. Tensions flare following the assassination of Empress Elisabeth of Austria in 1898. In 1908, Austria-Hungary formally annexes Bosnia-Herzegovina, sparking tensions with Serbia, which the Austro-Hungarians come to regard as a serious obstacle to their further conquest of the Balkans. The Balkan Wars of 1912–1913 see the Ottomans almost completely forced from the region, and relations between Austria-Hungary and Serbia deteriorate further. The significance of the middle portion of the bridge also becomes undermined, as residents of different ethnicities become suspicious and wary of one another.

In June 1914, Bosnian Serb student Gavrilo Princip assassinates Archduke Franz Ferdinand in Sarajevo, setting off a chain of events that lead to the outbreak of World War I. Austria-Hungary declares war on Serbia, and the local authorities begin to incite Višegrad's non-Serb population against the town's Serb residents. The bridge with the old road to Sarajevo suddenly regains its importance, as the railway line is not adequate to transport all the materiel and soldiers who are preparing to attack Serbia in the autumn of 1914. Austria-Hungary's invasion is swiftly repulsed and the Serbians advance across the Drina, prompting the Austro-Hungarians to evacuate Višegrad and destroy portions of the bridge.

== Writing and publication ==
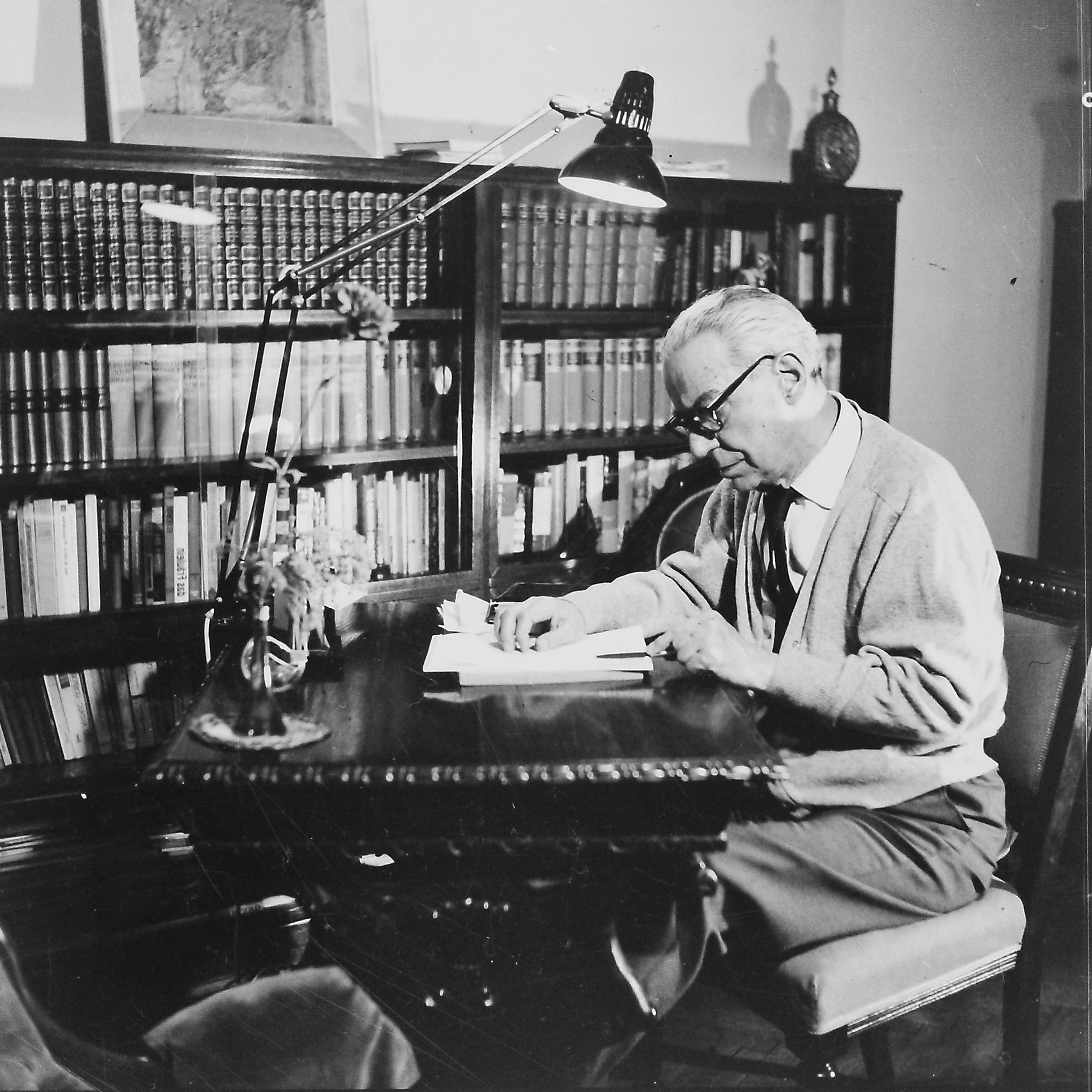
Andrić in his private study

Ivo Andrić was Yugoslavia's best known and most successful literary figure, and was awarded the Nobel Prize in Literature in 1961. He was born to Antun Andrić and Katarina Pejić near Travnik on 9 October 1892, but spent most of his childhood in the town of Višegrad. His formative years were spent in the shadow of the town's most distinctive landmark, the Mehmed Paša Sokolović Bridge. As a child, Andrić played in its vicinity and heard the legends surrounding it and its patron, Mehmed-paša Sokolović. Born into a Bosnian Serb family on the outskirts of the town, Sokolović had been abducted by the Ottomans as a child as part of the devşirme tax imposed on Christian subjects, taken to Istanbul and inducted into the janissary corps. Despite this, he remained in contact with his Christian family, and in 1557, convinced the Porte to grant the Serbian Orthodox Church autonomy. (Note: The Church's leader at the time, Patriarch Makarije, is thought to have been Sokolović's brother or nephew. The following three Patriarchs were also relatives of Sokolović.)

Andrić's literary career began in 1911, and prior to the outbreak of World War I, he published a number of poems, essays and reviews, and also translated the works of foreign writers. In the years leading up to the war, he joined a number of South Slav student movements calling for an end to the Austro-Hungarian occupation of Bosnia and Herzegovina. He was also a close friend of Princip. In late July or early August 1914, Andrić was arrested by the Austro-Hungarians for his connections to Franz Ferdinand's assassins. He spent much of World War I in captivity, and was only freed in July 1917, after Emperor Charles declared a general amnesty for political prisoners. In 1920, Andrić entered the diplomatic service of the newly created Kingdom of Serbs, Croats and Slovenes (later renamed Yugoslavia) He published a short story titled The Bridge on the Žepa, which was to serve as a prototype for the Bridge on the Drina, in 1925. In 1939, he was appointed as Yugoslavia's ambassador to Germany, which went on to spearhead an invasion of his country in April 1941, within the wider context of World War II. Andrić and his staff were arrested by the Germans following the invasion. In June 1941, he was permitted to return to Belgrade. Andrić was retired from the diplomatic service and confined to a friend's apartment by the Germans, living in conditions that some biographers have likened to house arrest. Over the following three years, he focused on his writing and pondered over the disintegration of Yugoslavia, which had become the scene of a brutal inter-ethnic civil war following the invasion.

The Bridge on the Drina was written between July 1942 and December 1943. (Note: Biographer Radovan Popović writes that the novel was finished in late 1944.) A fifty-page outline of the novel has been preserved, as have Andrić's research notes. In March 1945, it became the first title released by the newly founded state-owned publishing house Prosveta, as part of a series entitled Južnoslovenski pisci (South Slav Writers). The first edition, numbering some 5,000 copies, was sold out by the end of that year. It was one of three novels that Andrić published in 1945, the others being Travnik Chronicle (Serbo-Croatian: Travnička hronika) and The Woman from Sarajevo (Serbo-Croatian: Gospođica), in September and November 1945, respectively. A total of five editions of The Bridge on the Drina were published over the next four years. Andrić's works attained international recognition only after he was awarded the Nobel Prize, and were translated into dozens of languages thereafter. The novel had been translated into English two years earlier by Lovett F. Edwards, in 1959.

== Style ==
The novel's release coincided with the end of World War II, as well as Partisan efforts to promote the style of socialist realism, exemplified by depictions of "superficial happiness" glorifying the values of communism. In contrast, Slavonic studies professor David A. Norris writes, "Andrić's Bosnia is often a dark world expressed through deep and complex narrative structures". Andrić never publicly expressed sympathy for communism and his works openly dealt with controversial questions of national identity at a time when the communists were propagating the idea of Brotherhood and Unity among the various Yugoslav peoples. Literary historian Andrew B. Wachtel believes that The Bridge on the Drina's focus on the distant past allowed Andrić to address contemporary social, political and religious issues without overtly abrading the delicate system of inter-ethnic tolerance that the communists had established in the post-war period.

Like almost all of Andrić's works, the book was originally written in Serbian Cyrillic. (Note: Serbo-Croatian can be written in either the Latin or Cyrillic script.) The characters use the Ijekavian dialect of Serbo-Croatian primarily spoken west of the Drina, while the narrator uses the Ekavian dialect spoken primarily in Serbia. This is a reflection of Andrić's own linguistic proclivities, as he had abandoned both written and spoken Ijekavian and reverted to Ekavian upon moving to Belgrade in the early 1920s. Both dialogue and narration passages are perfused with Turkisms (Serbo-Croatian: Turcizmi), words of Turkish, Arabic or Persian origin that had found their way into the South Slavic languages under Ottoman rule. Turkisms are so prevalent that even the novel's title contains one: the word ćuprija, derived from the Turkish word köprü, which means bridge. Also present are many words of German and Ladino origin, reflecting the historical and political circumstances of the time period described in the novel.

The novel's first 100 pages deal with the bridge's construction and the remaining 200 revolve around the Austro-Hungarian period. Andrić himself characterized The Bridge on the Drina as a chronicle rather than a novel. In the introduction to his English-language translation, Edwards also declined to classify it as a novel, for "its scope is too vast, its characters too numerous, its period of action too long." Literary scholar Annabel Patterson writes: "There is no hero or heroine to hold it together, nor even a family or dynasty. In place of these there is the bridge, whose birth we attend, whose stability we come to count on." Patterson hesitates to characterize The Bridge on the Drina as a historical novel because most of the events described in it actually occurred as opposed to having been fictionalized. She notes that other scholars have classified it as a "non-fiction novel", a term she considers superfluous. "If we wish for simplicity," she writes, "we can call The Bridge on the Drina a novel to distinguish it from Andrić's collections of short stories. But if we wish for precision, The Bridge on the Drina can best be classified as a collection of short stories of peasant life held together by a bridge." The book deviates from other texts that have been described as chronicles in that the narrator observes events itinerantly and retrospectively. The style of storytelling Andrić employs is often likened to a transcendent historical monologue. Literary scholar Guido Snel believes that such a stylistic interpretation neglects the novel's dialogic properties and its ability to act as a back-and-forth between the narrator and reader, drawing a connection between the past described in the novel and the reader's present. This has caused Serb scholars to uphold Andrić's narrative authority, Snel writes, and Muslim scholars to challenge and reject it.

== Themes and motifs ==
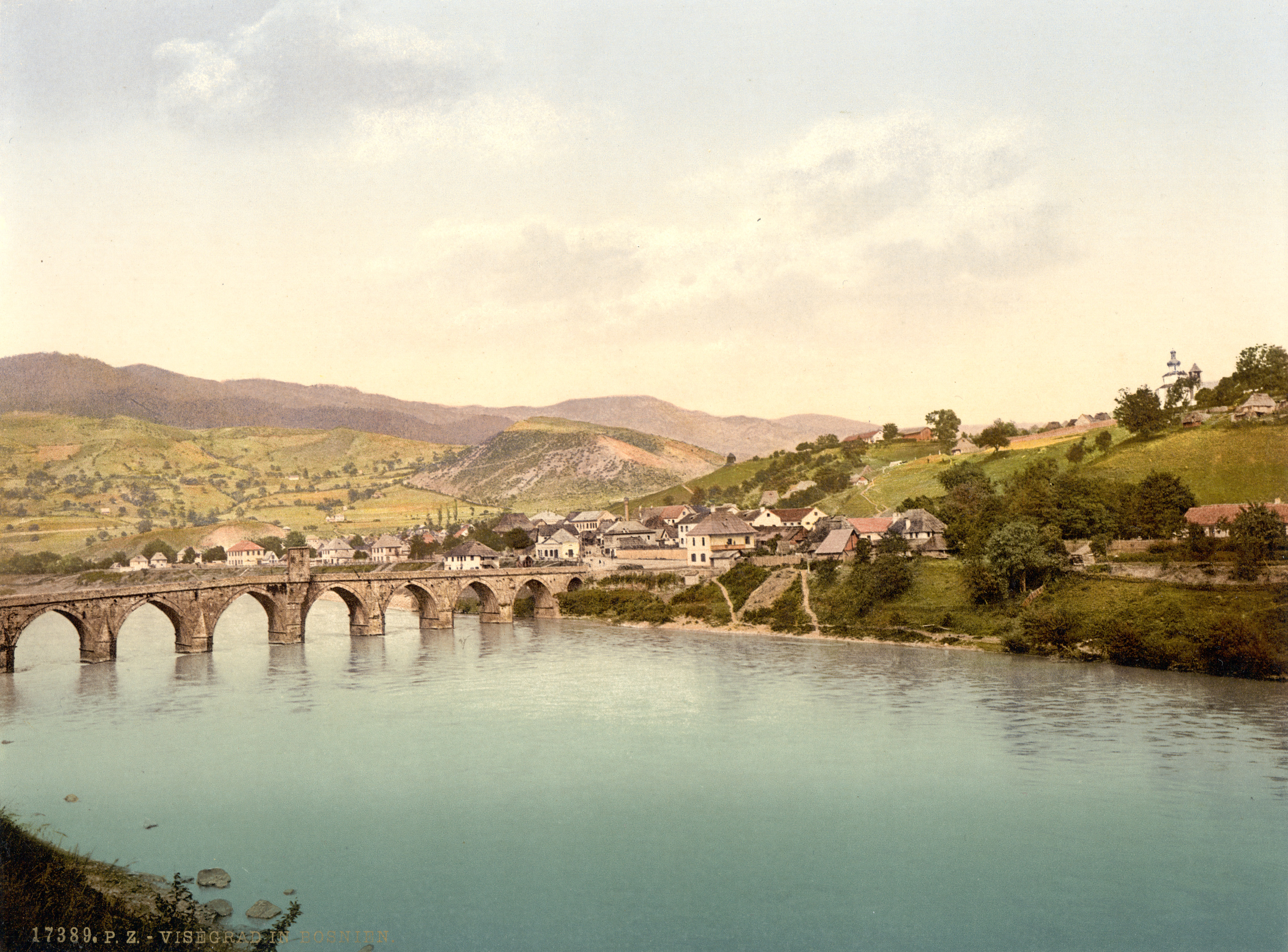
The Mehmed Paša Sokolović Bridge over the Drina River, ca. 1900

The Bridge on the Drina remains Andrić's most famous novel and has received the most scholarly attention of all his works. Most scholars interpret the eponymous bridge as a metonym for Yugoslavia, which was itself a bridge between East and West during the Cold War, "partaking of both but being neither". However, at the time of writing, the country did not enjoy the reputation of an inter-civilizational mediator, which was fostered by Yugoslav leader Josip Broz Tito only after his split with Soviet leader Joseph Stalin in 1948. Thus, the novel can be seen as having contributed to the formation of this national self-image. Andrić suggests that the building of roads and bridges by Great Powers is rarely done as a gesture of friendship towards local populations, but rather as a means of facilitating conquest. Thus, the bridge is both a symbol of unification and division. It is a symbol of unification in that it allows the inhabitants of Višegrad to cross from one bank to the other and in that the kapija serves as a popular meeting place. On the other hand, it divides the town's inhabitants by acting as a constant reminder of the Ottoman conquest.

Michael Sells, a professor of Islamic history and literature, posits that one of the novel's main themes is race betrayal. In Andrić's view, Sells asserts, Slavs are "racially Christian", and the conversion of some to Islam is perceived as a great evil epitomized by the practice of devşirme. The legend of Christian infants being buried alive within a bridge stems from The Building of Skadar, a Serbian epic poem dating back to the Middle Ages. Sells interprets the legend as an allegory for the entrapment of Slav converts to Islam within the structures of an alien religion. He describes Andrić's depiction of Muslim characters as mono-dimensional. Muslim Slavs depicted in the novel, he asserts, fall under three types: "the evil Turk", "the good Turk" and the janissary, who secretly mourns being severed from his Christian brethren. These character depictions, Sells argues, betray Andrić's stereotypical notions of Islam. Ani Kokobobo, a professor of Slavic studies, believes violence is a theme that offers conceptual cohesion to the novel's otherwise fragmented narrative. The most notable depiction of it is the impalement of Radisav of Unište, who attempts to sabotage the construction of the bridge. Several scholars interpret Radisav's impalement as an allegory for the state of Bosnia itself—subjected, vulnerable and fragmented between Christianity and Islam.

The historian Tomislav Dulić interprets the destruction of the bridge at the novel's conclusion as having several symbolic meanings. On the one hand, it marks the end of traditional Ottoman life in the town and signals the unstoppable oncome of modernity, while on the other, it foreshadows the death and destruction that await Bosnia and Herzegovina in the future. Dulić describes the ending as "deeply pessimistic", and attributes Andrić's pessimism to the events of World War II.

== Reception and legacy ==
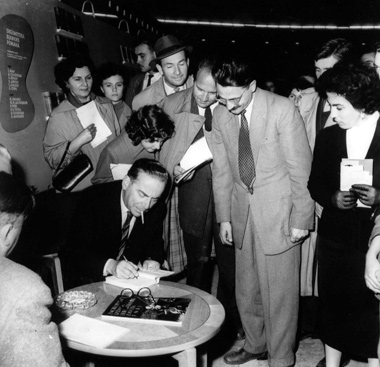
Andrić signing books at the Belgrade Book Fair

The three novels Andrić published in 1945 were an immediate success. The Bridge on the Drina was instantly recognized as a classic by the Yugoslav literary establishment. The novel played an important role in shaping Andrić's Tito-era reputation as the very embodiment of Yugoslav literature, a "living equivalent to Njegoš". From its publication in 1945 until the dissolution of Yugoslavia in 1991–92, the novel was required reading in Yugoslav secondary schools.

The novel's literary and historical significance was instrumental in persuading the Swedish Academy to award Andrić the Nobel Prize. In his introduction to Andrić's acceptance speech, Royal Swedish Academy of Sciences member Göran Liljestrand took note of the symbolic significance of the bridge and described Andrić as a unifying force. "Just as the bridge on the Drina brought East and West together," Liljestrand said, "so your work has acted as a link, combining the culture of your country with other parts of the planet." Following Andrić's death in 1975, Slovene novelist Ivan Potrč wrote an obituary praising the Nobel Laureate. "Andrić did not merely write The Bridge on the Drina," Potrč remarked. "He built, is building and will continue to build bridges between our peoples and nationalities."

After being awarded the Nobel Prize, Andrić donated the original manuscript to the city of Sarajevo. The manuscript is kept at the Museum of Literature of Bosnia and Herzegovina, which was established as a direct result of Andrić becoming a Nobel laureate, and it is regarded as its most valued possession. In subsequent decades, large sections of the Croatian and Bosnian Muslim (Bosniak) (Note: The name Bosniak was adopted by a congress of leading Bosnian Muslim intellectuals in September 1993. Prior to this, Bosniaks were referred to as Bosnian Muslims.) literary establishments distanced themselves from Andrić's body of work due to his strong ties with Serbian culture. In 1992, at the outset of the Bosnian War, a Bosnian Muslim destroyed a bust of Andrić in Višegrad using a sledgehammer. Later that year, more than 200 Bosniak civilians were killed on the bridge by Bosnian Serb militias and their bodies tossed into the Drina. By 1993, owing to the war and consequent ethnic cleansing, the multi-ethnic Bosnia described in the novel had largely been consigned to history. Andrić and his works, particularly The Bridge on the Drina, remain a source of controversy among Bosniaks due to their alleged anti-Muslim undertones. The Turkish writer Elif Shafak has stated that the novel radically changed her perception of Ottoman history. "Suddenly, I had to rethink what I thought I knew," Shafak wrote for the New Statesman. "I had to unlearn. What Andrić’s novel did for me at that young age was to shake years of nationalistic education, and whisper into my ears: "Have you ever considered the story from the point of view of the Other?""

Patterson describes The Bridge on the Drina as a seminal work whose themes and motifs—forced labour, invasion, annexation and displacement—would appear frequently in subsequent 20th-century fiction. The town of Višegrad and its historic sites were popularized throughout Yugoslavia as a result of the novel, to which the Mehmed Paša Sokolović Bridge owes its renown. The Bridge on the Drina was widely read by Western scholars, reporters and policy makers amidst the Yugoslav Wars of the 1990s, and sometimes cited as one of the two most important texts ever written about the Balkans, the other being Rebecca West's 1941 travel book Black Lamb and Grey Falcon. The bridge has been declared a national monument by the Commission to Preserve National Monuments of Bosnia and Herzegovina (KONS), and was recognized as a World Heritage Site by UNESCO in 2007. In 2011, the Serbian filmmaker Emir Kusturica began construction of a mock-town called Andrićgrad in the vicinity of the bridge. Andrićgrad was officially opened on 28 June 2014, the 100th anniversary of Franz Ferdinand's assassination. Kusturica intends to use it as a set for a future cinematic adaption of the novel. In 2019, Pope Francis quoted a passage from the novel at a press conference in Rabat, Morocco while arguing for amity and concord between nations.
