= Marxism and the National Question =

1913 Russian-language political pamphlet by Joseph Stalin

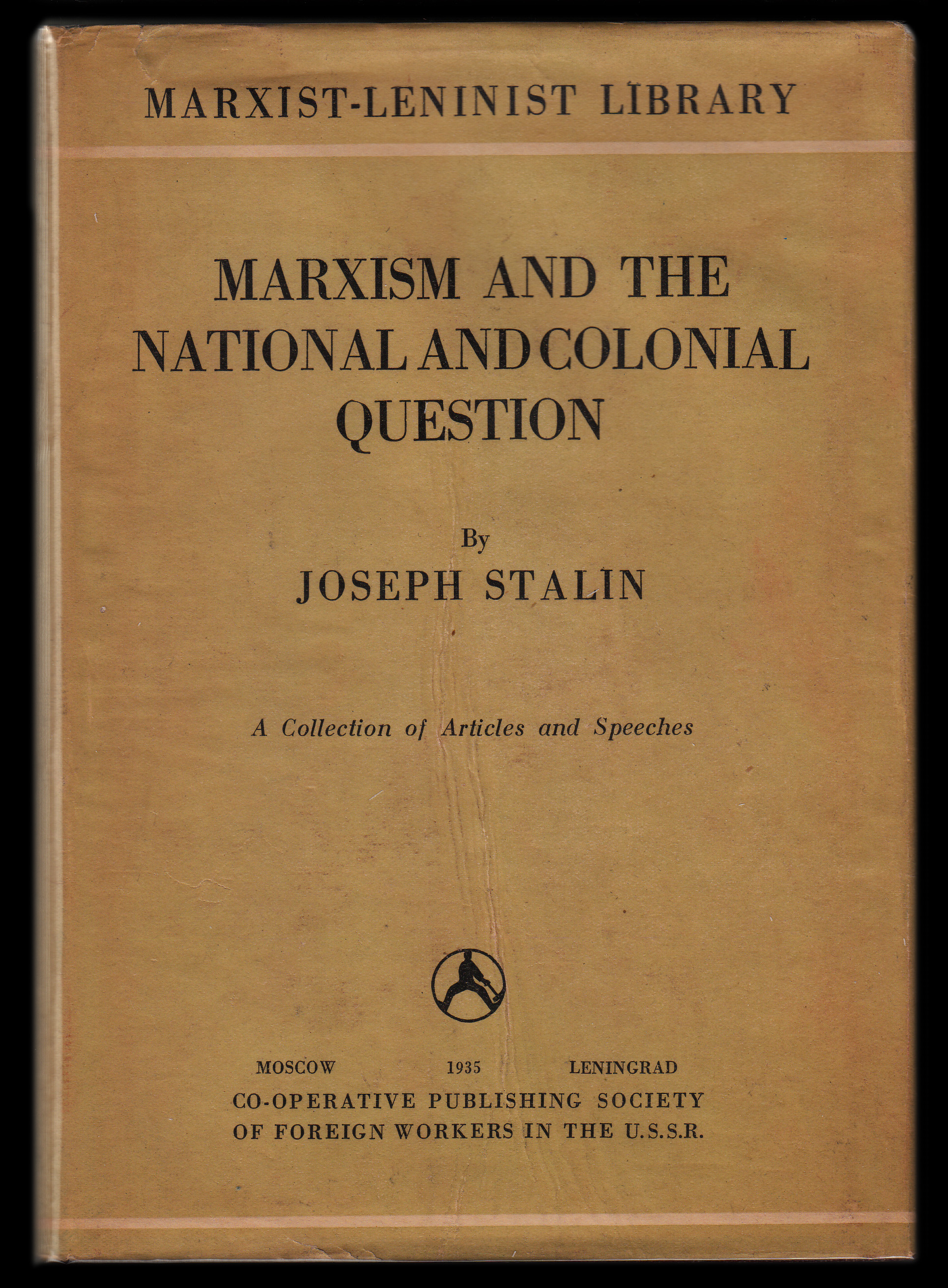
Marxism and the National Question was reprinted in the USSR in 1934 as part of the book Marxism and the National and Colonial Question, an English language edition of which first appeared in June 1935.

Marxism and the National Question (Russian: Марксизм и национальный вопрос, romanized: Marksizm i natsionalniy vopros) is a short work of Marxist theory written by Joseph Stalin in January 1913 while living in Vienna. First published as a pamphlet and frequently reprinted, the essay by the ethnic Georgian Stalin was regarded as a seminal contribution to Marxist analysis of the nature of nationality and helped to establish his reputation as an expert on the topic. Stalin would later become the first People's Commissar of Nationalities following the victory of the Bolshevik Party in the October Revolution of 1917.

Although it did not appear in the various English-language editions of Stalin's Selected Works, which began to appear in 1928, Marxism and the National Question was widely republished from 1935 as part of the topical collection Marxism and the National and Colonial Question.

== Content summary ==
With his thesis reduced to a single line, Stalin concluded, "A nation is a historically constituted, stable community of people, formed on the basis of a common language, territory, economic life, and psychological make-up manifested in a common culture." In defining a nation in this manner, Stalin took on the ideas of Otto Bauer, for whom a nation was primarily a manifestation of character and culture. Lenin had opposed the ideas of Bauer and Karl Renner, and preferred the theories of Karl Kautsky, which conceived of a nation as territorial.

Thus defined, Stalin took aim at the notion of "national–cultural autonomy", charging that the formulation was but a cloaked form of nationalism in socialist garb. Stalin argued that such an approach would lead to the cultural and economic isolation of primitive nationalities and that the path forward should be the unification of various nations and nationalities into a unified stream of higher culture.

== Background ==
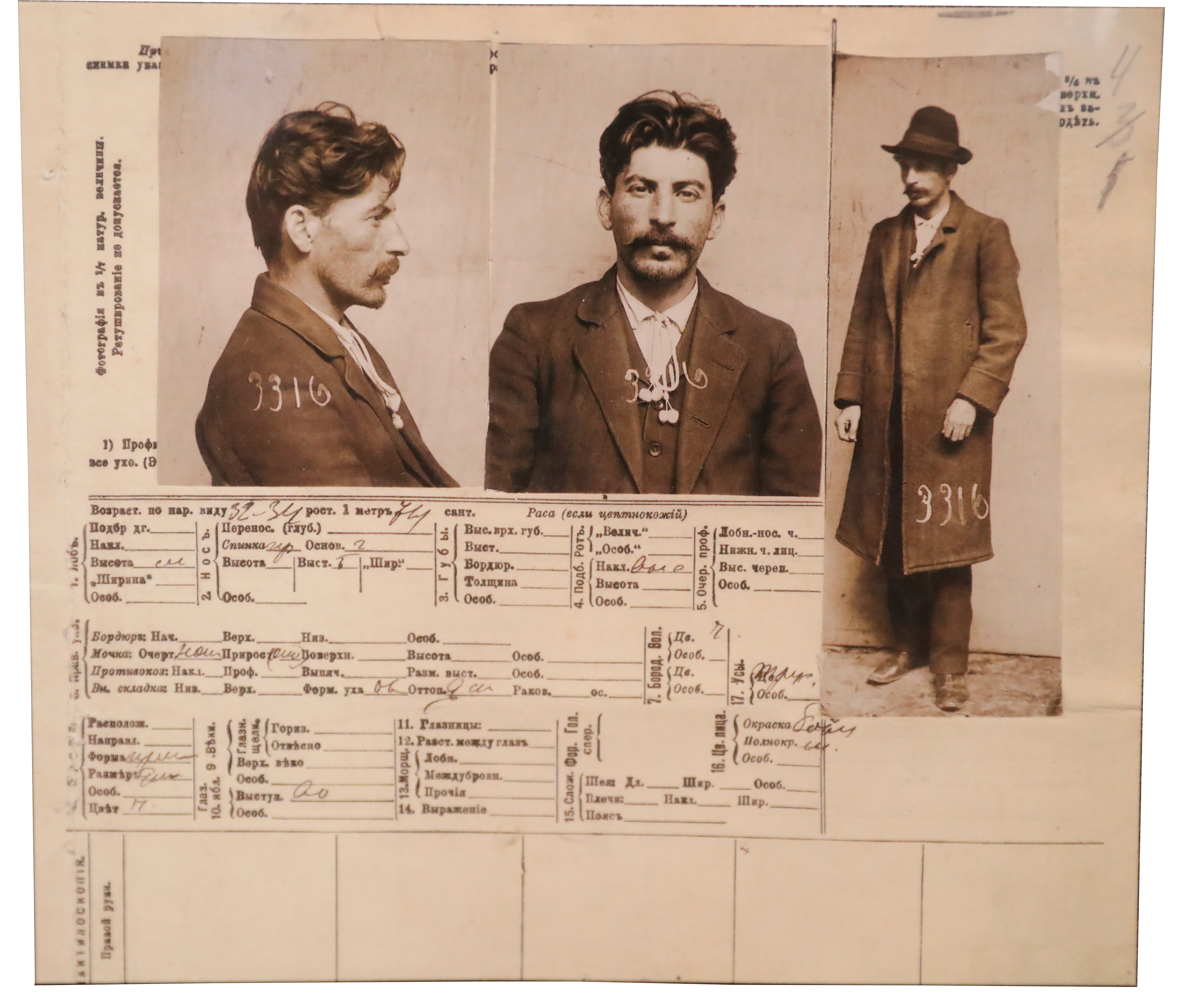
Stalin in 1911 mugshots taken by the Tsarist secret police

The founders of Marxism, Karl Marx and Friedrich Engels, had not written much on nationalism, not even a definition of the word. This led to debates among how to proceed in multinational states like the Russian and Austro-Hungarian Empires.

Ioseb Jughashvili (1878–1953), better known by his Anglicized party name Joseph Stalin, was an ethnic Georgian intellectual and Marxist revolutionary affiliated with the Bolshevik wing of the Russian Social Democratic Labour Party (RSDLP). Jughashvili regarded Bolshevik leader Vladimir Lenin (1870–1924) as a role model and intellectual beacon, and the young activist was sometimes jokingly called "Lenin's left foot" by his Georgian comrades. Jughashvili did not just admire the exiled Lenin from afar through correspondence but had even met him personally, with the pair jointly attending the 1907 Congress of the RSDLP held in London as part of a 92-member Bolshevik delegation.

From the time he left the seminary (one of the only higher educational channels available to Georgian intellectuals at that time), Jughashvili was a so-called "professional revolutionary", a paid employee of the Bolshevik party organization dedicated full time to revolutionary activity. Prior to 1910, Jughashvili's main political activity took place in the Transcaucasian region of the Russian empire, making a home in the Azerbaijani oil city of Baku from 1907. Jughashvili helped to organize Marxist study circles and worked as an agitator and journalist, writing for the Bolshevik party press. He was a reasonably prolific writer during this period, producing no fewer than 56 articles and leaflets. He also preserved pieces of political correspondence. (Note: The count of such items from the years before 1910 officially exceeded 100 although the attribution of some of these items is regarded by historian Robert McNeal as dubious.)

Despite the mass of his written output, Jughashvili's earliest writing was mainly topical and ephemeral, with only a series of newspaper articles written for the Bolshevik press in opposition to anarchism during the Russian Revolution of 1905 gaining permanence through republication as the pamphlet Anarchism Or Socialism? This first effort at writing a generalized work of Marxist theory in serial form was incomplete, as it was interrupted early in 1907 by Jughashvili's departure from Tiflis to London for the Bolshevik Congress there and by his subsequent move to Baku. No additional substantial contribution to theory would be made until the writing of Marxism and the National Question in 1913.

Despite the paucity of substantial writing, Jughashvili was well regarded by the Bolshevik leaders in exile, and he was co-opted in absentia to the governing Central Committee of the now independent Bolshevik Party at the 1912 Party Conference held in Copenhagen. Jughashvili, now known by his party name "Stalin," (Note: "Stalin" is a Russian-sounding pseudonym derived from the word stal, steel.) was at the same time named one of four members of a "Russian Bureau" for the day-to-day direction of the activity of the Bolshevik Party within the borders of the Russian empire by the émigré Copenhagen party conference.

== Writing ==
The actual writing of Marxism and the National Question began in November 1912, when Stalin traveled to Kraków (then under Austrian rule), to confer with Lenin on Bolshevik party business. Lenin had published an article earlier that same month condemning nationalist fragmentation of the revolutionary movement, holding up as the disintegration of the Social Democratic Party of Austria into autonomous German, Czech, Polish, Ruthenian, Italian and Slovene groupings as a grim example. Lenin feared a comparable shattering of the RSDLP along national lines and sought to crush the Austro-Marxist slogan of "national–cultural autonomy."

Stalin, as an antinationalist Georgian with no fear of ethnic Russian domination of the RSDLP, was seen both as an expert on the current interrelationship of the various nationalities of Transcaucasia and as a potential national minority voice in favor of the maintenance of a centralized and unified party organization. Stalin was set on the task of writing a lengthy article for publication in the Bolshevik theoretical monthly Prosveshcheniye (Enlightenment) detailing an official position on the matter. Regarding Stalin's assignment to write such an article, Lenin wrote to novelist Maxim Gorky in February 1913:

About nationalism, I fully agree with you that we have to bear down harder. We have here a wonderful Georgian who has undertaken to write a long article for Prosveshchenie after gathering all the Austrian and other materials. We will take care of this matter.

Stalin began work as early as January 1913, though on Lenin's advice, Stalin settled in Vienna to work on the article, as the city was a focal point for the discussion in socialist circles. Lacking a strong knowledge of German, Stalin read Russian translations of key works, and had assistants find material and translate for him.

== Publication history ==
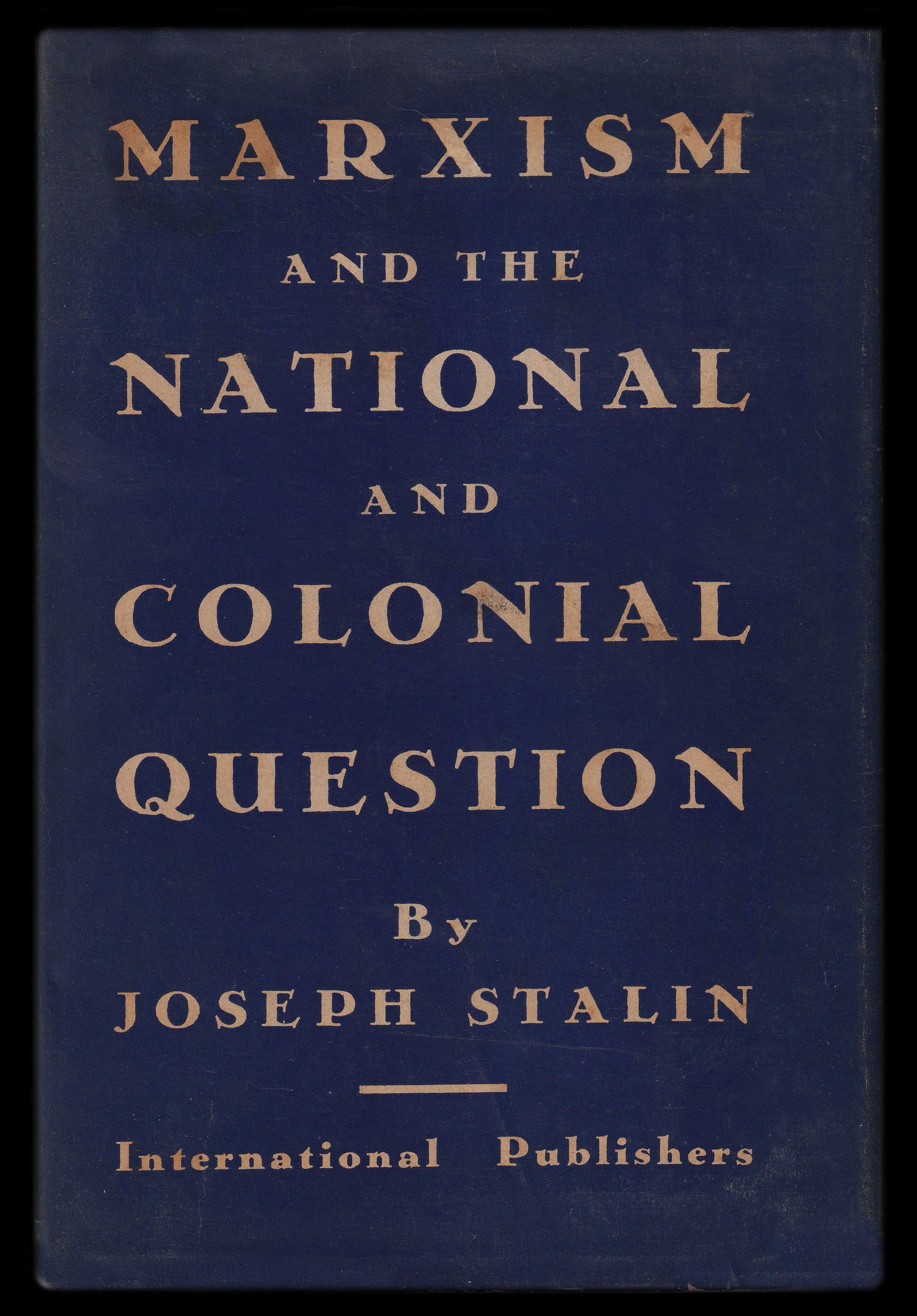
The first American edition of Marxism and the National and Colonial Question (1935)

Marxism and the National Question was completed late in January 1913, with the author signing the work "K. Stalin." The work first appeared in serial form in the Bolshevik magazine Prosveshchenie (Enlightenment), with installments appearing in the March, April, and May 1913 issues of that publication. The original title of the work as it appeared in 1913 was Natsional'nye vopros is Sotsial-Demokratii (The National Question and the Social Democracy). The three articles were combined for republication in pamphlet form as Natsional'nyi vopros i Marksizm (The National Question and Marxism) in 1914.

Marxism and the National Question was not included in any one- or two-volume Russian version of Stalin's Selected Works (Russian: Вопросы Ленинизма, romanized: Voprosy Leninizma, lit. 'Problems of Leninism'), which first appeared in 1926, or in any English-language translation of this book appearing from 1928 to 1954. However, the work was reprinted as the lead essay in a 1934 Russian topical collection, Marksizm i natsional'no-kolonial'nyi vopros, and its English translations in the following year, Marxism and the National and Colonial Question. Two nearly simultaneous editions appeared in 1935, one published in Moscow and Leningrad by the Co-operative Publishing Society of Foreign Workers in the USSR (forerunner of the official Foreign Languages Publishing House) and another in New York under the imprint of International Publishers. It was also included in the volume two of the collection Works (Russian: Сочинения, romanized: Sochineniya). The new title remained in print thereafter, throughout Stalin's lifetime.

== Authorship controversy ==
Leon Trotsky, a fellow Bolshevik and later opponent of Stalin, would later state that the article was "undoubtedly Stalin's most important — rather his one and only — theoretical work." However he also challenged the authorship of the article, questioning why Stalin did not write anything of "remotely comparable quality either before or after". This speculative charge by Trotsky has found its way into the historical literature, echoed by such Stalin biographers as Isaac Deutscher and Bertram D. Wolfe. Other historians paying attention to the question have differed, with Robert H. McNeal concluding that while Lenin "certainly helped form Stalin's ideas on the nationality question before the essay of 1913 was composed" and "probably edited it for republication in 1914," at root "the work remains essentially Stalin's." Stalin biographer Robert C. Tucker concurred that "there is no good reason to credit Lenin—as Trotsky did—with virtual authorship of the work." He added that Stalin "needed little if any assistance in those important sections of the work that dealt with the Bund and the national question in the Transcaucasus." Historian Ronald Grigor Suny dismisses the accusation, noting that as a "defeated opponent" of Stalin, Trotsky was being "ungenerous".

== See also ==
- Korenizatsiya
- National delimitation in the Soviet Union
- Narkomnats, or People's Commissariat for Nationalities - the commissariat within the Council of People's Commissars which would be headed by Joseph Stalin, and would deal with nationalities
  - Muskom - the Muslim Commissariat, chaired by Mullanur Waxitov
- Population transfer in the Soviet Union
- Soviet of Nationalities

== Bibliography ==
- Hirsch, Francine (2005), Empire of Nations: Ethnographic Knowledge and the Making of the Soviet Union, Ithaca, New York: Cornell University Press, ISBN 978-0-8014-8908-2
- Kotkin, Stephen (2014), Stalin, Volume I: Paradoxes of Power, 1878–1928, New York City: Penguin Press, ISBN 978-1-59420-379-4
- Martin, Terry (2001), The Affirmative Action Empire: Nations and Nationalism in the Soviet Union, 1923–1939, Ithaca, New York: Cornell University Press, ISBN 978-0-80-143813-4
- McNeal, Robert H. (1967), Stalin's Works: An Annotated Bibliography, Stanford, California: Hoover Institution on War, Revolution and Peace, OCLC 00407430
- Montefiore, Simon Sebag (2007), Young Stalin, London: Phoenix, ISBN 978-0-297-85068-7
- Stalin, I.V. (1949), "Марксизм и Национальный Вопрос" [Marxism and the National Question], Сочинения [Works], vol. 2, Moscow: Gosudarstvennoe Izdatelstvo Politicheskoy Literatury, pp. 290–367, OCLC 465259526
- Suny, Ronald Grigor (2020), Stalin: Passage to Revolution, Princeton, New Jersey: Princeton University Press, ISBN 978-0-691-18203-2
- Trotsky, Leon (2016), Stalin: An Appraisal of the Man and his Influence, translated by Woods, Allan, London: Wellread Books, ISBN 978-1-900-00764-1
- Tucker, Robert C. (1973), Stalin as Revolutionary, 1879–1929: A Study in History and Personality, New York City, New York: W.W. Norton & Company, ISBN 0-393-05487-X
- van Ree, Erik (2002), The Political Thought of Joseph Stalin: A study in twentieth-century revolutionary patriotism, New York City: RoutledgeCurzon, ISBN 0-7007-1749-8
