= Svrzo's House =

Museum in Sarajevo

Coordinates: 43.8624°N 18.4293°E

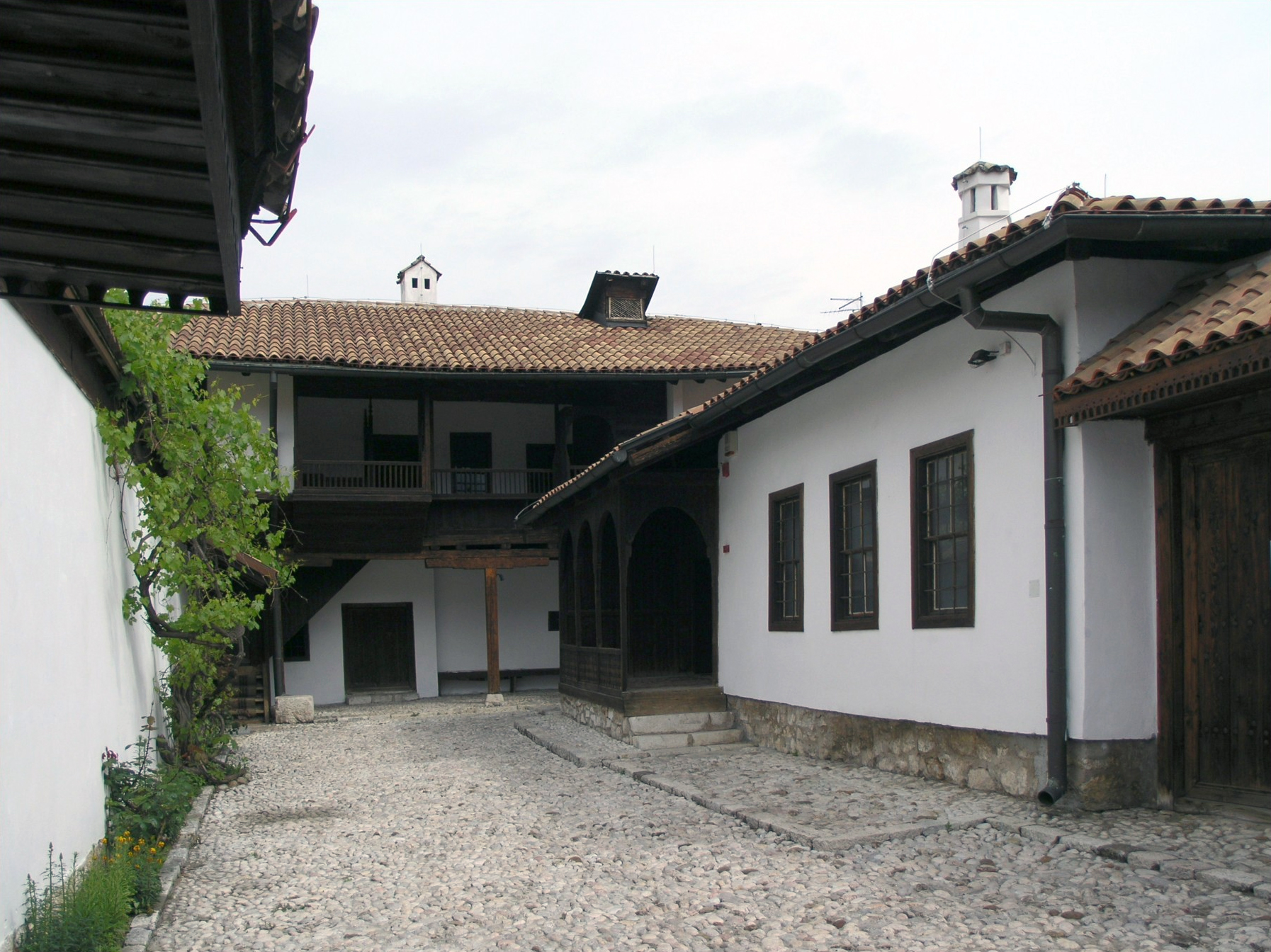
- Established: 18th century
- Location: Sarajevo, Bosnia and Herzegovina
- Website: www.muzejsarajeva.ba

Svrzo's House is an old house in Sarajevo, Bosnia and Herzegovina that was established when the Ottoman Empire ruled the area. It is a branch of the Museum of Sarajevo. It is typical in that it has living quarters for the men, the women, and the servants. The house is in extremely well preserved condition, which is noteworthy in that the house is built completely from wood; a construction method not commonly used in the region in modern times. It is open to the public for self-guided tours and has brochures and information in multiple languages.
