= Museum of Sarajevo 1878–1918 =

Museum in Sarajevo

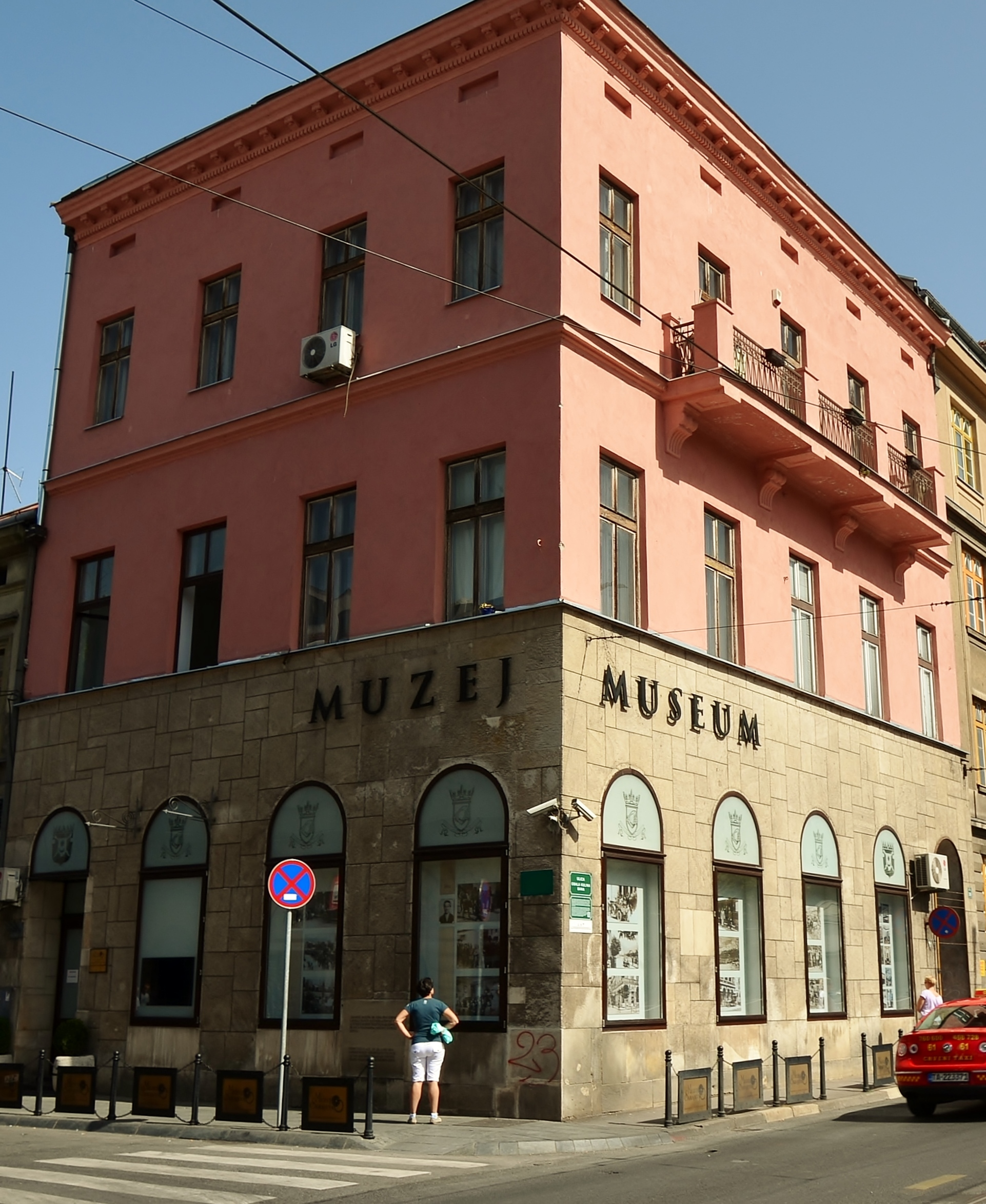
- The museum in 2015
- Established: 28 June 1953; 73 years ago
- Location: Sarajevo, Bosnia and Herzegovina
- Coordinates: 43°51′28.46″N 18°25′44.12″E
- Website: www.muzejsarajeva.ba

The Museum of Sarajevo 1878–1918 (Bosnian, Croatian and Serbian: Muzej Sarajevo 1878–1918 / Музеј Сарајево 1878–1918) is located near the Latin Bridge in central Sarajevo, the capital of Bosnia and Herzegovina. Established in 1953, the museum was named after Young Bosnia and Gavrilo Princip. The building, at Zelenih beretki 1 (Sarajevo 71000), had housed Moritz Schiller's Delicatessen in 1914, the year that Franz Ferdinand, the heir presumptive to the throne of Austria-Hungary was shot dead by Gavrilo Princip on the street outside. His assassination triggered the July Crisis, which led to the outbreak of World War I.

== Museum ==
On 28 June 1953, the government of Federal People's Republic of Yugoslavia opened the "Museum of Young Bosnia and Gavrilo Princip" at the site of the assassination. During the Bosnian War of the 1990s, the museum was renamed to "Museum of Sarajevo 1878–1918" by the Sarajevo Canton Assembly. The museum is part of the Museum of Sarajevo. The permanent exhibition holds a collection of items and photographs with which the museum presents a chronological history of Austro-Hungarian rule in Bosnia and Herzegovina. It is divided into thematic units:

- Resistance to occupation
- Administration and cultural life
- Cultural and religious-educational societies, printing houses and publishing
- Industry and architecture
- The effect of Austro-Hungarian annexation of Bosnia and the Bosnian Parliament
- The Assassination of Crown Prince Franz Ferdinand and his wife Sofia leading to World War I.

Given Princip's often widely differing perception to different parts of society (freedom fighter to many Serbs and pan-Yugoslavs, terrorist forerunner of Karadžić to some Bosniaks), the museum tends to downplay the historic significance of the building despite its location being the main draw for many visitors.

== Princip's gun ==
The pistol on display in the museum is a replica, not Princip's original. Shortly after the assassination, his actual gun was given, along with the Archduke's bloody undershirt, to Anton Puntigam, a Jesuit priest who was a close friend of the Archduke and had given the Archduke and his wife their last rites. The pistol and shirt remained in the possession of the Austrian Jesuits until they were offered on long-term loan to the Museum of Military History in Vienna in 2004. It is now part of the permanent exhibition there.

== Princip's 'footsteps' and memorial plaques ==
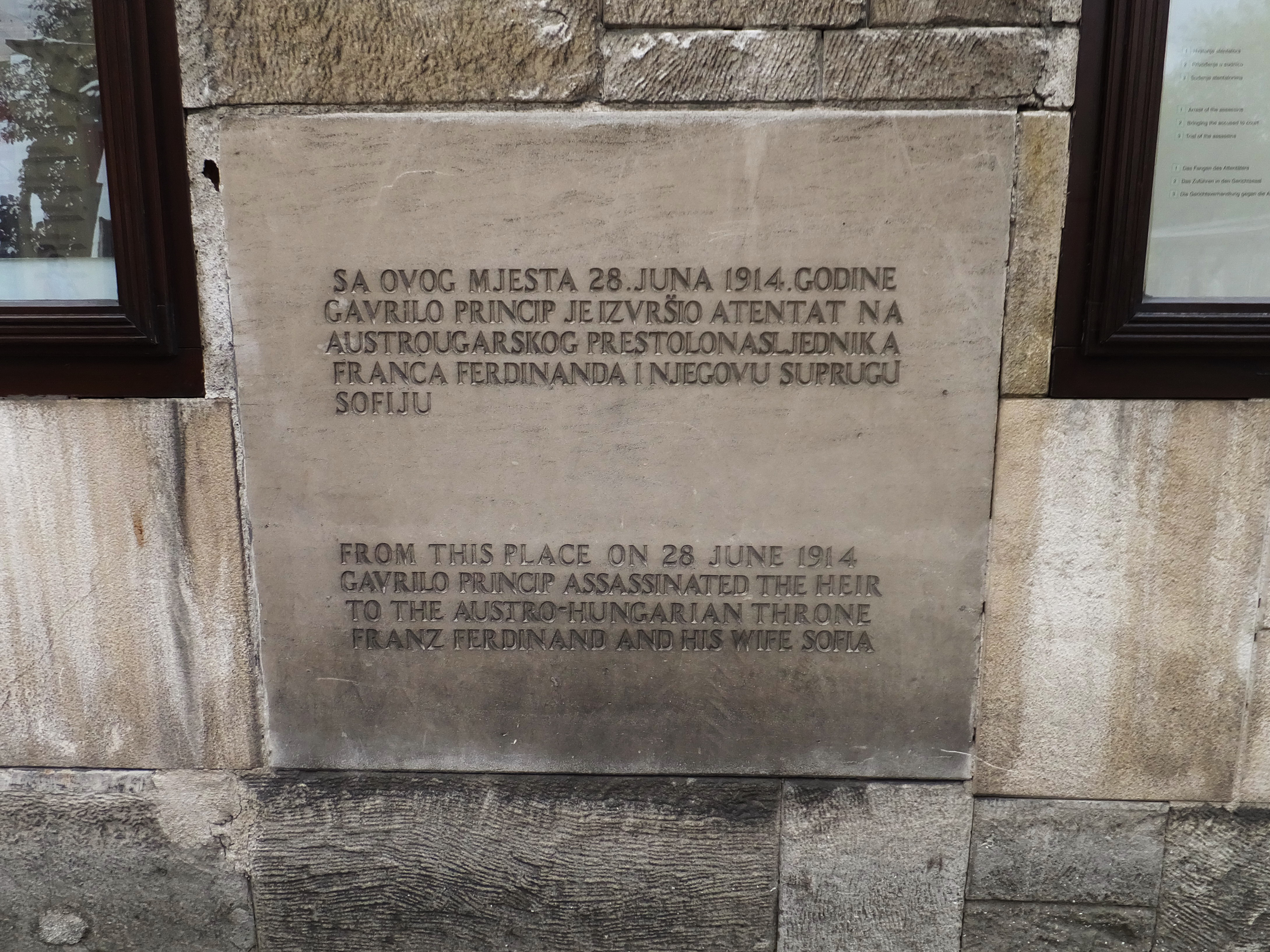
The site of the assassination is marked by a small plaque, written in both Serbo-Croatian and English

As the corner outside the museum building marked the point from which Princip had launched his attack, it has been the site of several memorials to the event, most of them short-lived. These include a pillar, erected in 1917, but destroyed the following year. In the 1940s, a plaque appeared but that was removed when the German Army invaded. After World War II, a new plaque was introduced along with 'footprints' set in the concrete of the pavement outside, very visually marking the point where Princip fired the fatal shots. They were popular among tourists and locals. These were bombed then torn out during the Bosnian War during which time the museum collection was hidden for safe keeping, and the 'footprint set' now on display in the museum is a replica.

To commemorate the centenary of the assassination, a new plaque was installed in 2014, stating: "From this place on 28 June 1914, Gavrilo Princip assassinated the heir to the Austro-Hungarian throne Franz Ferdinand and his wife Sofia."

== See also ==
- List of museums in Bosnia and Herzegovina
