= Prosveshcheniye =

Prosveshcheniye (Russian: Просвещение, 'Enlightenment') was a legal Bolshevik socio-political and literary monthly magazine in Russia.

== History and profile ==
Prosveshcheniye began publication in St. Petersburg in December 1911. Maxim Gorky was editor of the fiction section.

Its inauguration was proposed by Lenin to replace the Bolshevik journal Mysl (Thought), a Moscow publication banned by the tsarist government.

The magazine was banned by the tsarist government on the eve of the First World War in June 1914. One further issue (a double one) appeared in the autumn of 1917.

In 1913 the magazine published an essay, Marxism and the National Question by Joseph Stalin, which outlined Bolshevik views on nationality. It was the first time Stalin, who was born Ioseb Jughashvili, had used his new name.
