= Coat of arms of Sarajevo =

Seal of Sarajevo

The Coat of Arms of Sarajevo (also known as the Seal of Sarajevo) is the coat of arms of the city of Sarajevo, the capital of Bosnia and Herzegovina. It was adopted in 2000.

Article 2 of the official act of the Sarajevo city council describes the seal as follows:

The top part of the seal depicts elements of typical roofs and at the same time symbolizes the hills. Middle part is the symbol of the city itself, represented by city walls and the city gate. The lower part represents the valley through which the bridged river flows and where the city is situated.

Article 3 describes the flag:

The flag of Sarajevo is light blue with the seal of Sarajevo placed in the centre. The flag may be manufactured in various sizes, but its aspect ratio is always 1:2.
