= Museum of Sarajevo =

Museum in Sarajevo, Bosnia and Herzegovina

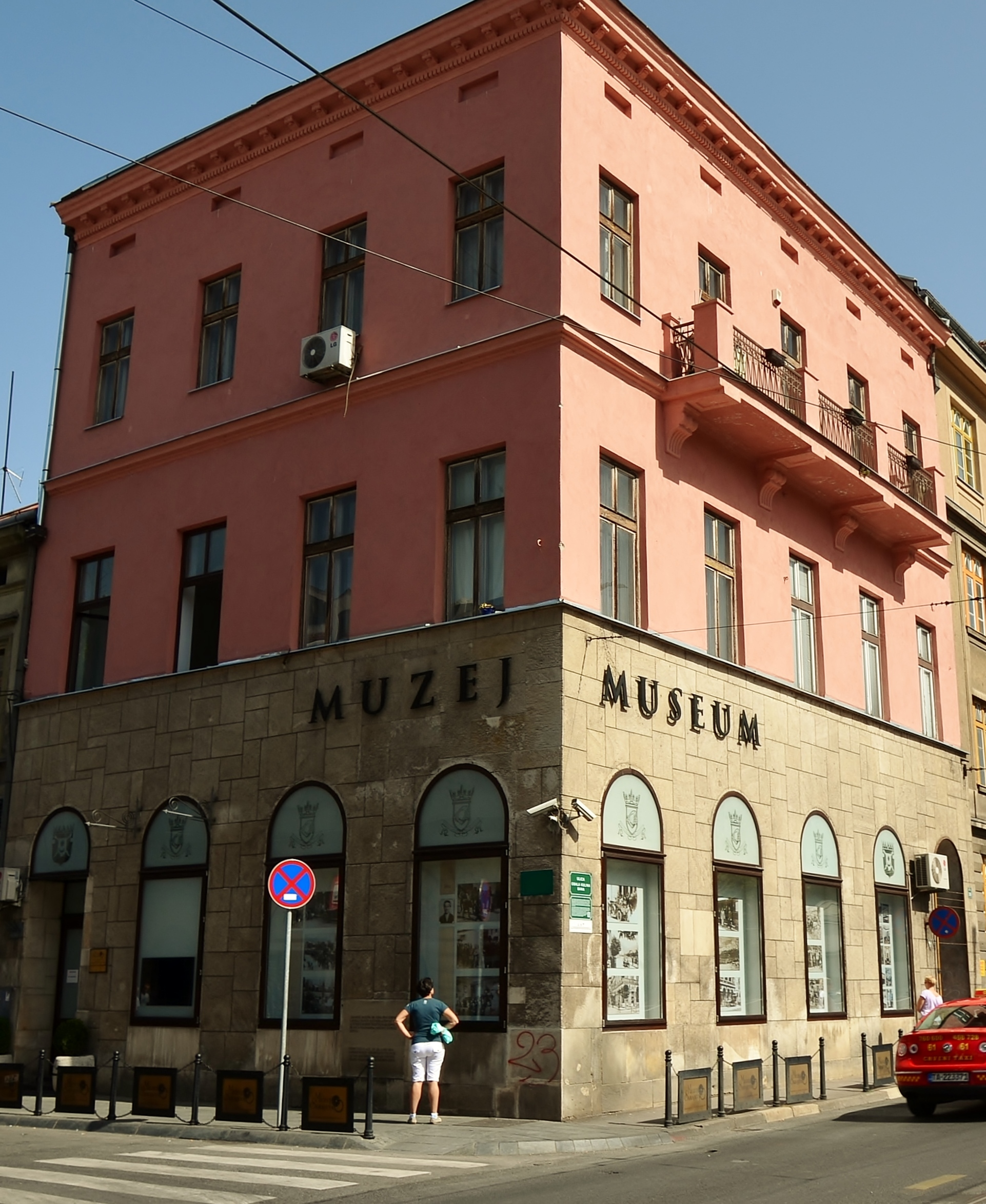
- In front of the Museum of Sarajevo annex, housing the Museum of Sarajevo 1878–1918 department
- Established: 1949
- Location: Josipa Štadlera 32
- Website: Museum of Sarajevo

Museum of Sarajevo, also Museum of the City of Sarajevo, is a museum of history and culture of Sarajevo, located in Stari Grad Municipality of the City of Sarajevo, Bosnia and Herzegovina. The museum is operated by JU Muzej Sarajeva (Public Institution Museum of Sarajevo), and housed in 19th century Bosnian biographer, Kosta Hörmann's Villa, in Josipa Štadlera 32 street on the municipality of Stari Grad.

The museum was founded in 1949 and has several departments and five annexes operating in historic locations and designated heritage sites, Svrzo's House, Despić's House, Brusa Bezistan, Museum of the Jews of Bosnia and Herzegovina and Museum of Sarajevo 1878–1918.

== See also ==
- National Museum of Bosnia and Herzegovina
