= Despić House =

Historic home and museum in Sarajevo, Bosnia

Coordinates: 43.8572°N 18.4277°E

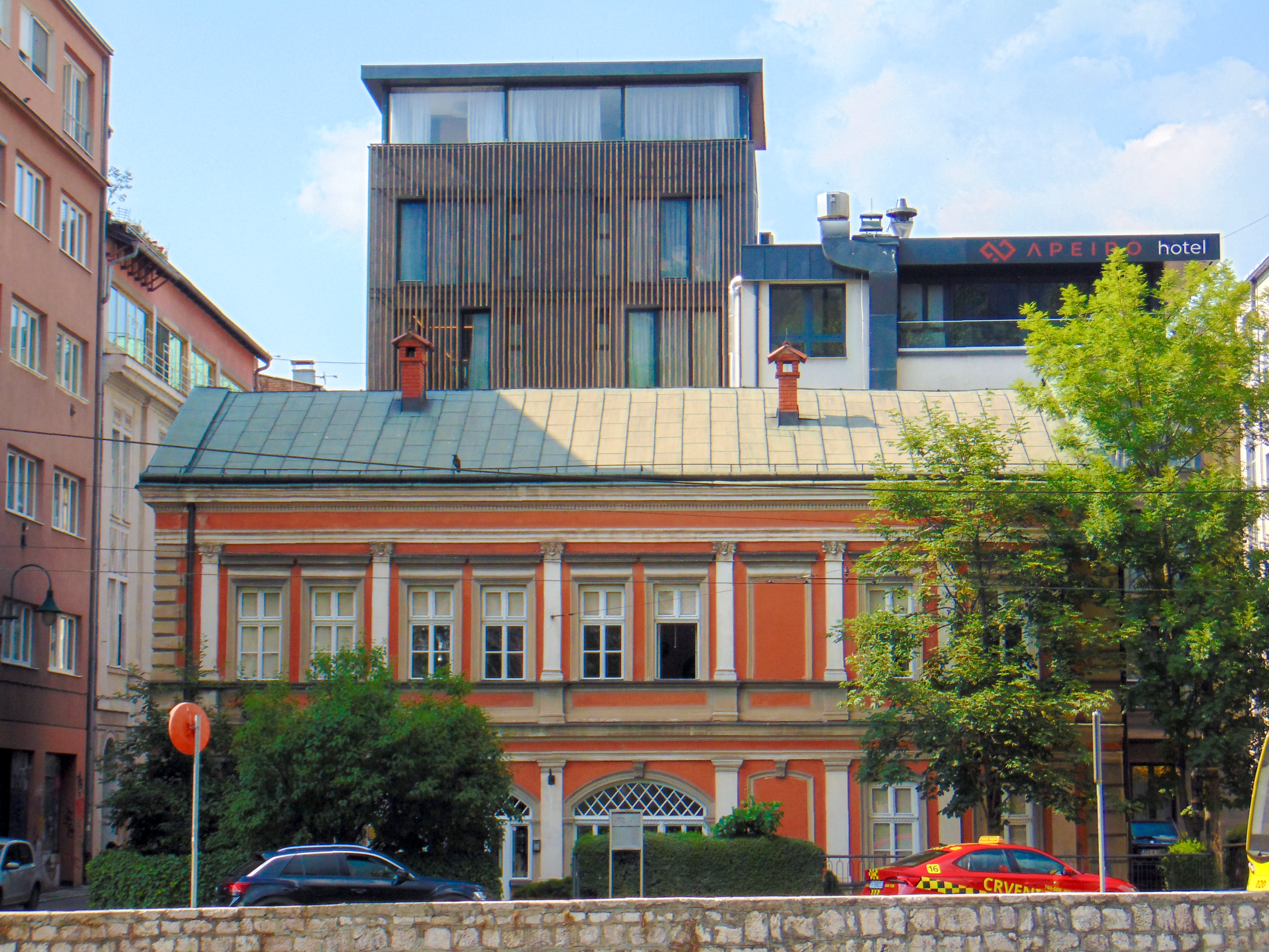
- Established: 1881
- Location: Sarajevo, Bosnia and Herzegovina
- Website: www.muzejsarajeva.ba

Despić House (Serbo-Croatian: Despića kuća, Деспића кућа) is an old merchant house in Sarajevo, Bosnia and Herzegovina that was established in 1881 by one of the wealthiest and most prominent Serb families in Sarajevo. It is a branch of the Museum of Sarajevo.
