= Pale, Republika Srpska =

Pale Пале
- Town and municipality
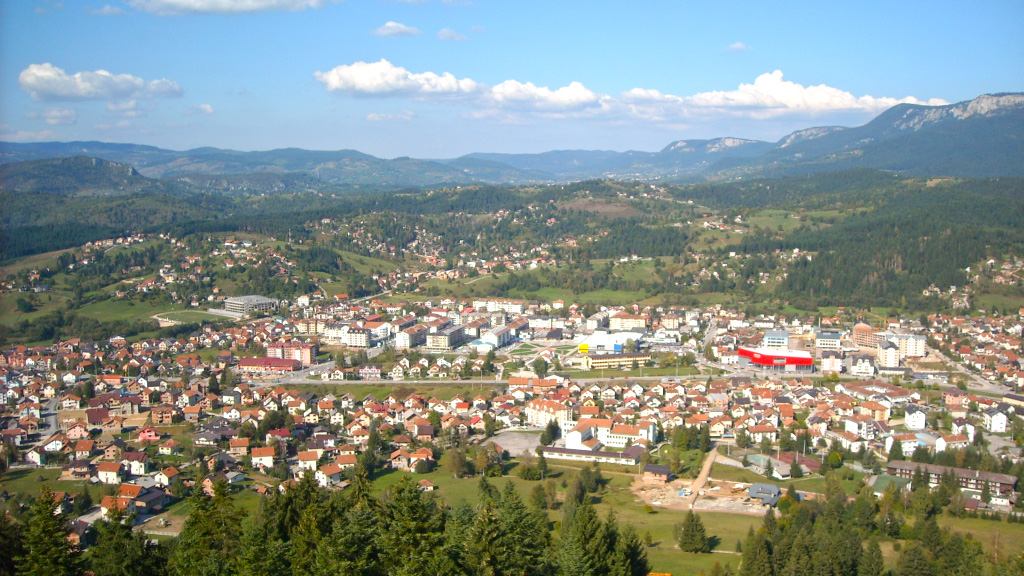
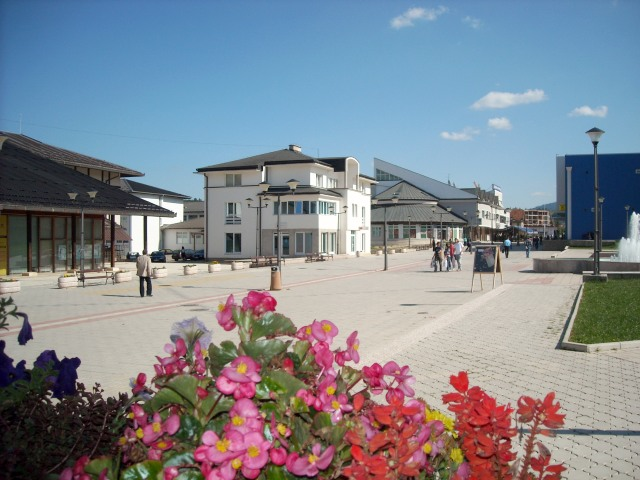
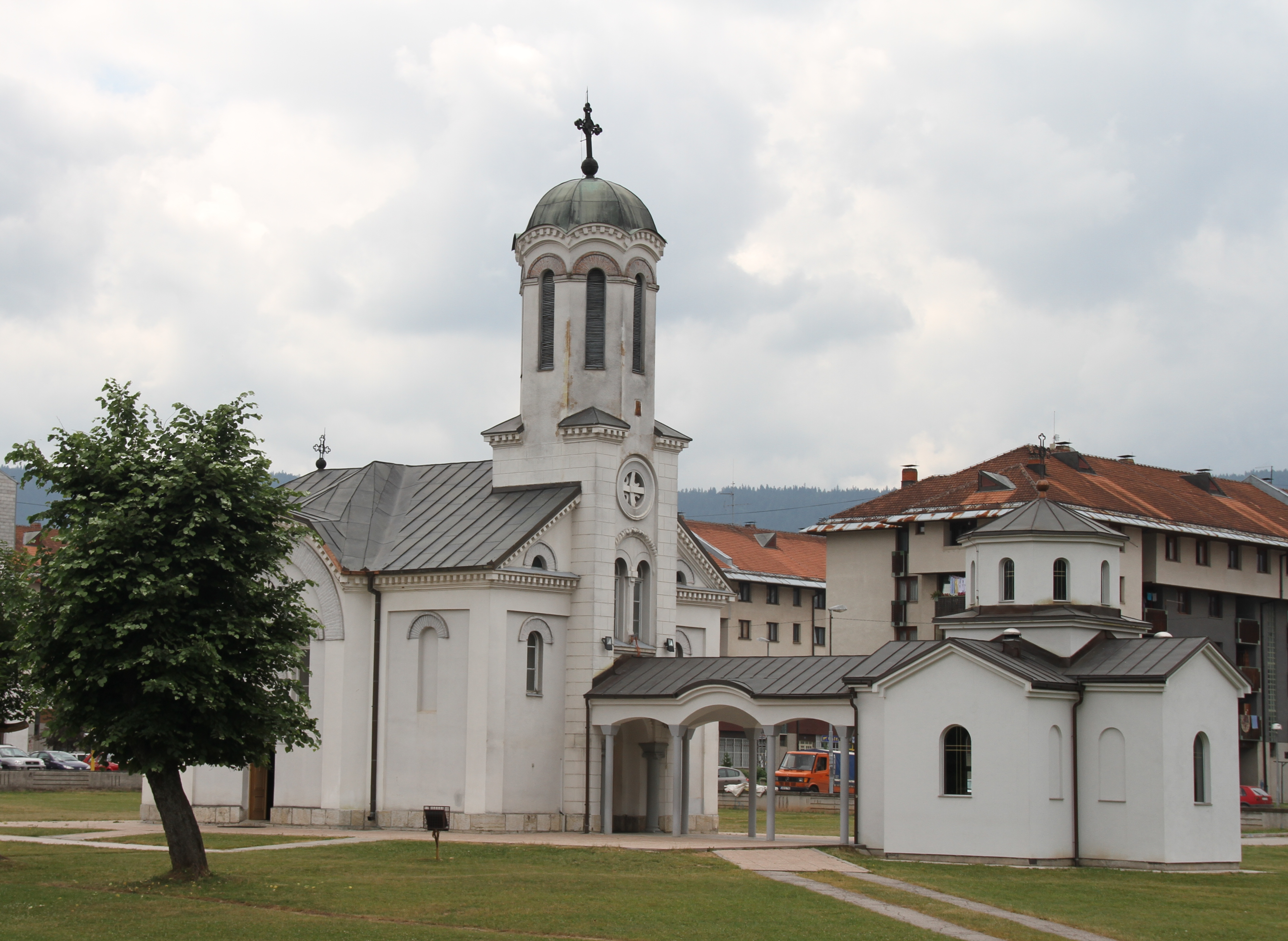
- Views of Pale

- Coat of arms

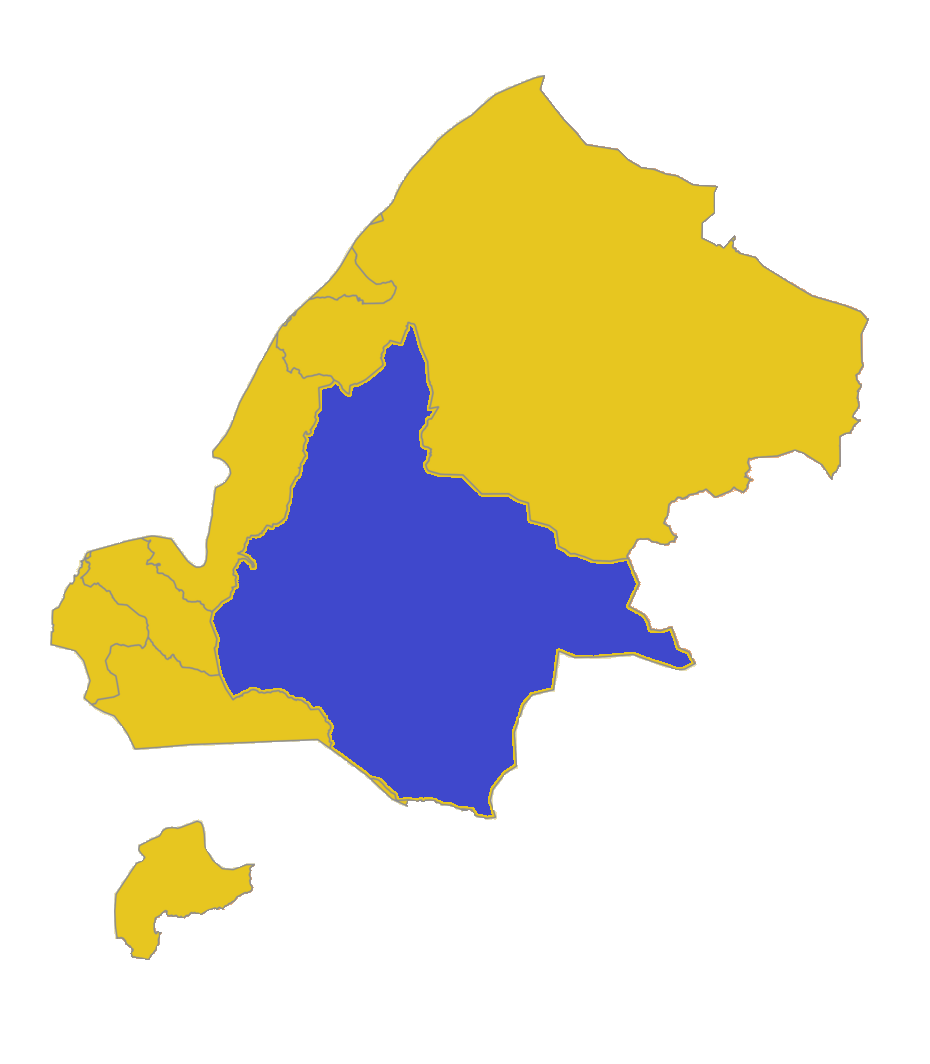
- Location of Pale within the city of Istočno Sarajevo
- Coordinates: 43°48′43″N 18°34′16″E
- Country: Bosnia and Herzegovina
- Entity: Republika Srpska
- City: Istočno Sarajevo
- Status: Suburban

Government
  - Municipal mayor: Dejan Kojić (DEMOS)
  - Municipality: 492.8 km^{2} (190.3 sq mi)

Population (2013 census)
  - Town: 13,883
  - Municipality: 22,282
  - Municipality density: 45.22/km^{2} (117.1/sq mi)
- Time zone: UTC+1 (CET)
  - Summer (DST): UTC+2 (CEST)
- Postal code: 71420
- Area code: +387 57

Pale (Serbian Cyrillic: Пале) is a town and municipality of the city of Istočno Sarajevo, Republika Srpska, Bosnia and Herzegovina. It is situated southeast of the inner city of Sarajevo, making it de facto a town and suburb of Sarajevo. As of 2013, it had a population of 22,282 inhabitants, while the town of Pale has a population of 13,883 inhabitants.

The famous Jahorina ski resort is located some 15 km (9.3 mi) from the municipality.

The Romanija mountainous region separates Pale from Sokolac, with highlands stretching out as far as Vlasenica and Rogatica.

== History ==
=== Middle Ages ===
Pale was mentioned as a nahiye in 1468, and likely existed priorly as a župa. The surroundings were held by the Pavlović family in the 15th century, with fortifications at Pavlovac on Prača river, Gradina in Gornje Pale and Hodidjed above the junction of the Miljacka rivers. The Hodidjed settlement served as an administrative center for the surrounding area. The Pavlović belonged to the higher nobility of the Kingdom of Bosnia, their holdings extended from Vrhbosna (today's Sarajevo) in the west to Dobruna in the east. Pavle Radenović, the founder of the Pavlović line, aside from his ancestral holdings around Pale also owned the mines in Olovo, the city of Trebinje, and parts of Konavle and Cavtat. The area under his control enjoyed prosperous trade between the locals and Ragusan merchants. The main trading center was the town of Prača, part of the Pale municipality today. After the death of the Bosnian King Tvrtko I in 1391 the Bosnian feudals houses struggled to gain the throne. The sons of Pavle, under threat from other Bosnian aristocrats, asked for aid in their allies, the Ottomans. The Ottomans pursued a strategy of divide and conquer that eventually resulted in complete conquest.

=== Ottoman rule ===
After the fall of Bosnia the feudal holdings of the House of Pavlović were divided into 11 districts, and renamed the entire area the "Pavli Vilayet. The first Ottoman census in the year 1468–69 the town of Pale is recorded under the name of "Bogazi Yumry" as the seat of one of the 11 districts. The district of "Bogazi Yumry" contained six villages of which two were located on the plane of Pale.

Due to the harsh conditions in which the local Christian population found itself, there is very little data about the urban development during the Ottoman rule of this area in the Middle Ages. The area continued to be commercially viable and valuable to the new rulers. The town of Prača continued to grow and expand until the great fire and outbreak of Black Death in the 18th century. The name "Pavli Vilayet" continued to be used for this area until the beginning of the 19th century and the town eventually came to be known as Pale. One of the earliest recordings of this new name is a map from 1877, where the town itself as well as the entire region are labelled as "Pale".

During the 19th century the Ottoman Empire found itself under the two politically and socially completely different power struggles. In 1831, Captain Husein Gradaščević, one of the wealthiest and most powerful members of the Bosnian aristocracy, came to lead the rebel aristocrats. After the conquest of Travnik, the seat of the Ottoman Viceroy, the Bosnian aristocracy demanded that the Ottoman Sultan halt his reform efforts and keep the status quo in Bosnia. In addition they wanted the right to vote for and appoint the Viceroy from among their ranks. Captain Husein did not wait for the Sultan to answer their demands and appointed himself the Vice Roy of Bosnia, alienating many of his supporters in the process. The Sultan played the different factions against each other and in 1832 sent an army against the rebels. One of the decisive battles against the rebels took place in the town of Pale itself. Captain Husein did not command sufficient numbers of troops and suffered a defeat. The decisive victory broke the back of the revolt.

=== Austro-Hungarian rule ===
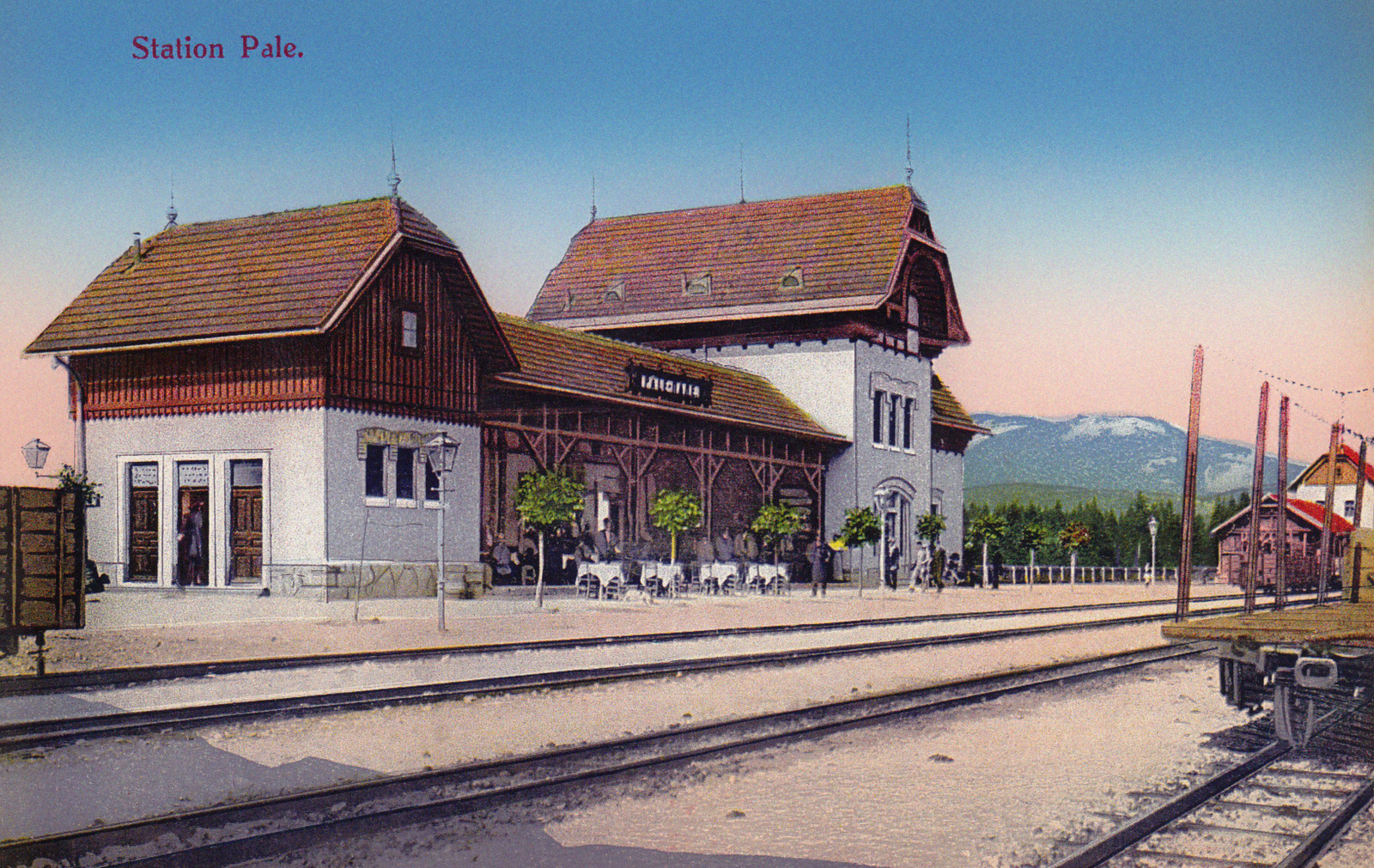
Railway station in Pale after opening in 1906

With the Berlin Congress Bosnia was placed under the administration of Austria-Hungary. During this time significant investment and economic changes were made in Pale and the surrounding areas. The new overlords were favoring the exploitation of the natural resources, primarily mineral and wood products. The town of Pale at this point becomes an important logging and wood products center in the region. According to the 1895 census, Pale with the adjacent villages had 483 inhabitants. 440 inhabitants were engaged in agricultural and logging activities while 27 were engaged in clerical work. Industrial development spurs on supporting activities. New trade shops, hotels and other service activities are brought to the town.

According to administrative records of the Austro-Hungarian administration, by 1879 in Pale there were already two modern log mills, and their products were transported to Sarajevo. With the construction of the rail line connecting the Bosnian capital of Sarajevo with its eastern border town Višegrad the town of Pale received its first railway station. The railway link enabled Pale to continue to grow and prosper with foreign investment making it possible to open several additional mills in the town. Construction of the Bosnian Eastern Railway from Sarajevo to Uvac and Vardište started in 1903. It was completed in 1906, using the 760 mm (2 ft 5 15/16 in) track gauge. With the cost of 75 million gold crowns, which approximately translates to 450 thousand gold crowns per kilometer, it was one of the most expensive railways in the world built by that time. The line was closed down in 1978, and dismantled afterwards. In February 1907, Pale opened it first elementary School. The school was administered by the school-church board of the Serbian Orthodox Church in Pale but admitted students regardless of faith, mostly children of people who were involved in the town log mill.'

=== World War I ===
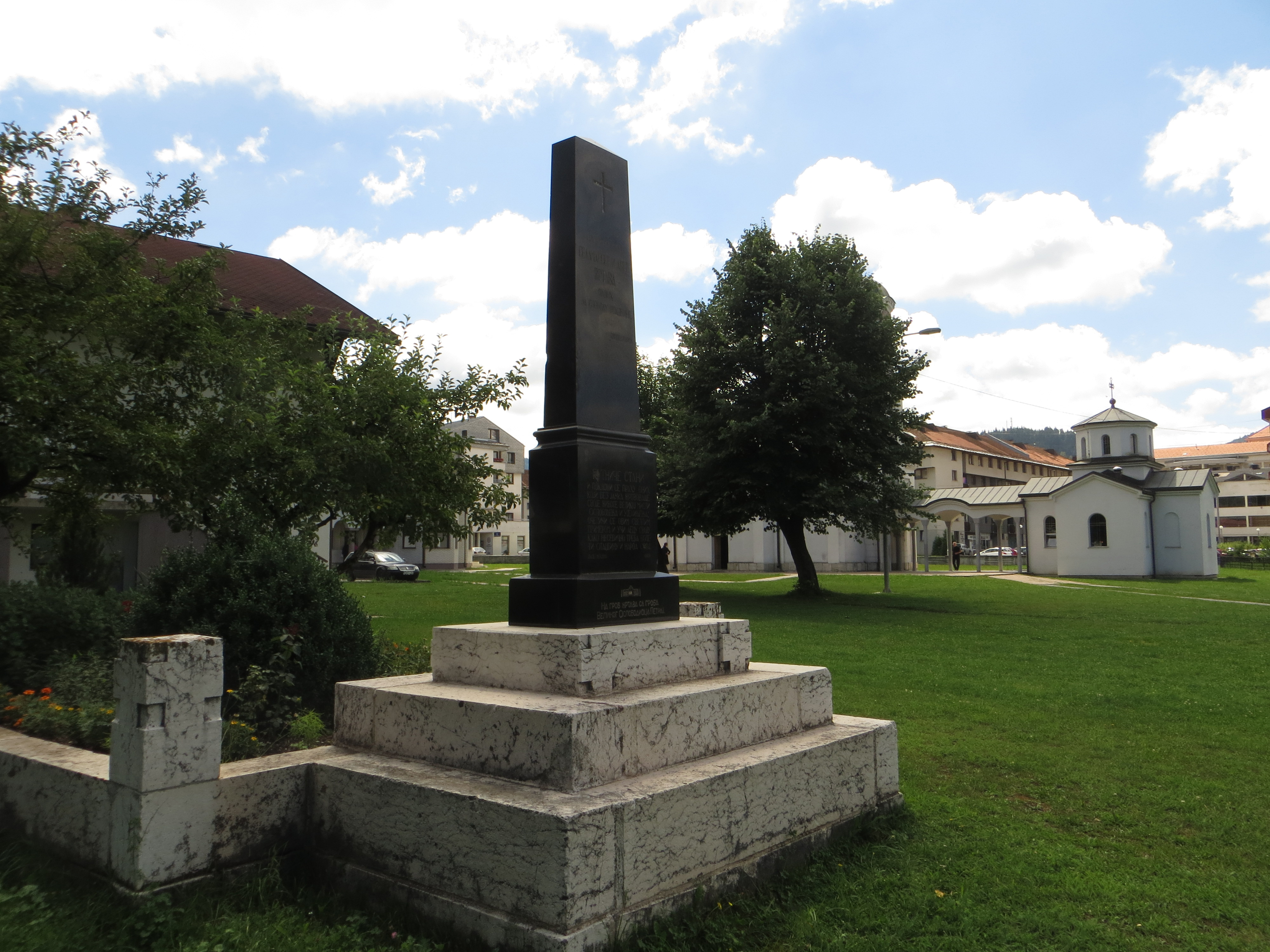
Monument dedicated to the WWI victims

In the early months of 1914 after the decisive Serbian victory at the Battle of Cer the allies requested from the Serbs and their Montenegrin allies to attack the Austro-Hungarians in Bosnia and tie up their forces there. In October 1914 the Serbo-Montenegrin armies penetrated the areas surrounding Sarajevo and gained control of Mount Romanija. During that operation, Montenegrin units entered Pale but they withdrew soon afterwards, leaving with a large part of the local Serb population.

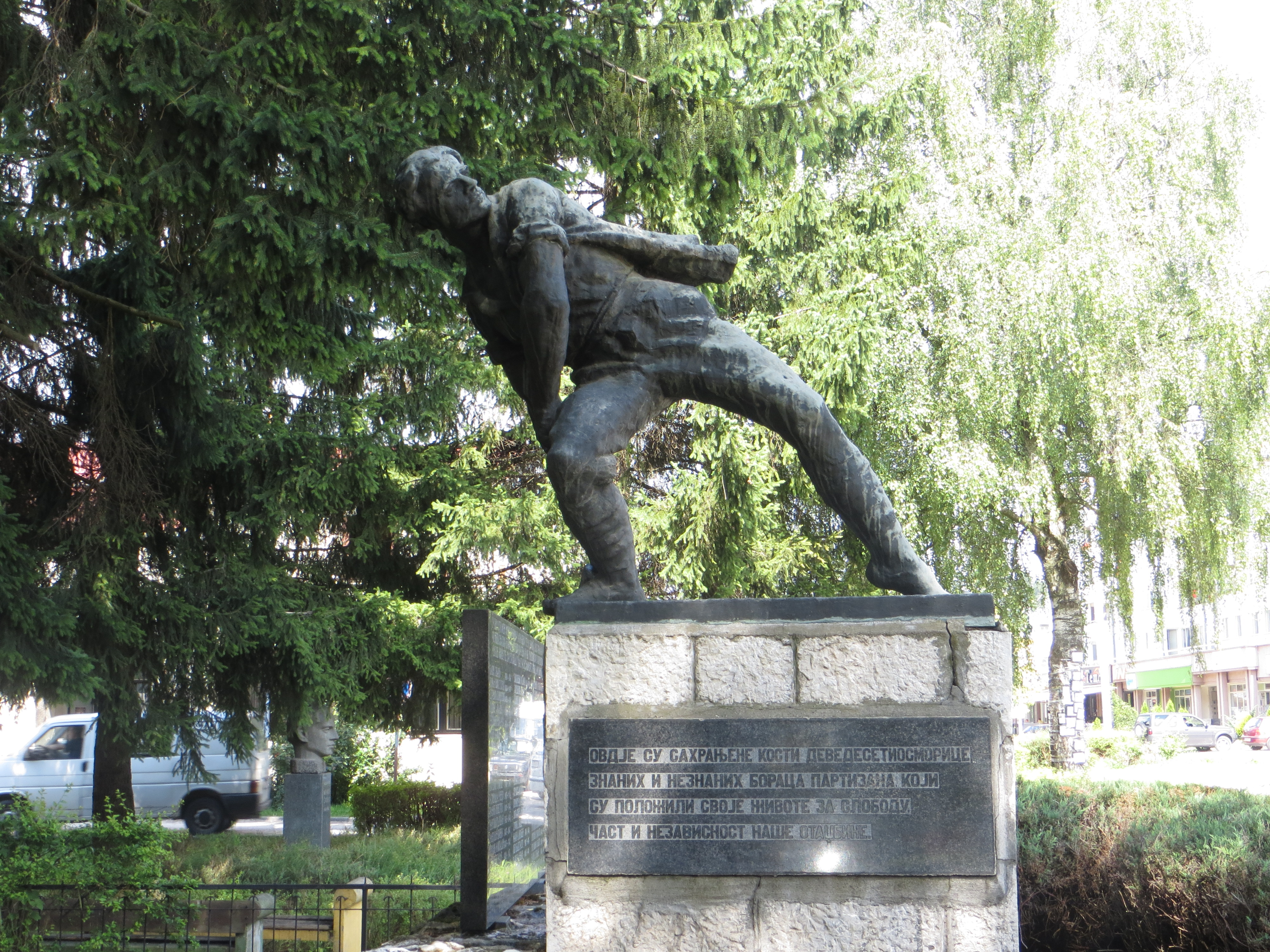
Monument to the 98 fallen Yugoslav partisans

Those who were unable to flee were at the mercy of the Austrian Schutz corps, irregular Austrian police forces tasked with suppressing revolt within the empire. Pale was pillaged and burned down completely after the Austrian forces re-entered the town, with 54 residents lynched in the town center. In the town of Goražde, a refugee column of villagers from nearby villages such as Prača, Vijara, Budj, Podgrab, Vrhpraca, Gorovici, Hotocine, Glasinac, Podromanija and Socica were intercepted by Austrian regular forces and the irregulars before they could cross the Drina river. 48 adult men were separated from the rest of the group and executed by pistol-shot, while the remaining refugees were forced into detention camps. Conditions in these detention camps were especially harsh. Among the most infamous was the detention camp in Doboj. From December 1914 to July 1917 more than 45,000 people (mostly Serbs) were detained there. While the exact numbers of fatalities will probably never be known, more than 1000 fatalities were identified, 230 of which were from the Pale municipality.

=== Post-World War I ===
With the end of the war and the absorption of Bosnia into the newly created Kingdom of Yugoslavia, the town of Pale once again struck out towards growth. The basis for economic recovery and development once again, as before, were based on the natural resources of the region, in particular forestry.

Newly developed transportation links with Sarajevo spurred growth. In 1928 the town itself became the center of the municipality. By 1939 there were more than 14 log mills in Pale which generated more than 90,000 cubic metres (3,178,320 cu ft) of wood products. Increased economic development spurred population growth. Between 1921 and 1931 the number of inhabitants increased from 2,382 to 11,103.

In the 1930 one could already find 30 to 40 large buildings. In 1935 a modern water supply system was put into use. The town flourished culturally as well. New and old schools were renovated and built. A community center, completed in 1928, dedicated to the victims of World War I featured gymnastic equipment and from time to time cultural and entertainment events were held there.

In 1934 the Vihor Football Club was founded, and along with it a new soccer stadium was constructed. The cultural and sport society "Soko" was responsible for a large level of participation by Pale's inhabitants in their athletic programs. The members of this club would go on to successfully compete in Zagreb, Ljubljana and Prague. In this period the town also received the first medical facility as well as a library.

By the 1940 Pale already have the looks of a small, but very well arranged city. A significant number of intellectuals as well as affluent and influential people from Sarajevo and other places in the country constructed summer homes in Pale. All of this was interrupted with the German attack on Yugoslavia in April 1941. After the conquests of Zagreb and Belgrade the German forces turned their drive towards the center of the country. On 15 April, a German motorized division would occupy Sarajevo and capture the Yugoslav Supreme Military command in the town of Pale itself. By April 1941 a complete surrender was signed. The short April war brought on a full dismemberment of the country. The town of Pale was incorporated into the Nazi-affiliated Independent State of Croatia, led by the Ustaše.

The first of act of the newly installed puppet regime in the town of Pale was the demolition of the World War I Victim Memorial as well the demolition of the Eastern Orthodox Church. All Serb enterprises were nationalized and taken over by Nazi sympathizers. The former home to the cultural center was turned into the HQ of the local regiment of Ustaše, which would soon serve as prison and detention center. Mass deportations, executions of prominent Serbs were daily occurrences. During the summer of 1941 the first massacres occurred, the villages of Njemanici and Bjelogorica were completely destroyed and more than sixty people were murdered.

Faced with this kind of mistreatment the local populace started an armed revolt. The initial skirmishes took place in the early morning hours of 1 August 1941. The occupation forces tried to brutally suppress this revolt and during the month of August more than 75 prominent town folk were arrested and deported to death camps.

In mid-November 1943 in a retaliatory expedition the Ustaše killed more than 100 inhabitants of the village of Rakovac. After 45 men out of that village reported to the Ustaše administration for the issuance of new identification documents they were all arrested and in pairs of two were chained to each other. They were transported and murdered. After they killed the men they went to Rakovac to kill the remaining women, children and the elderly. During World War II, in the municipality of Pale more than 1200 civilians were murdered, while another 350 resistance fighters were killed in the fighting.

=== Socialist Yugoslavia ===
After World War II, the town and municipality of Pale, thanks to the tireless efforts of the local population, slowly recover and resume their economic development. In 1946 on the foundations of the old log mil a new one is constructed. This new mill would produce more than 25,000 cubic metres (882,867 cu ft) of wood products. The mill itself employed more than 170 in the mill and an addition 150 in the forest.

In 1952, a military maintenance facility in the suburb of Koran was constructed. The local economy received the first important building block for the metal industry. Between 1952 and 1960 an additional 300–400 employees were hired in that facility. With the development of the metal industry there are significant migration into the town, the suburb of Koran is built out with new building and apartment complexes constructed. In 1968 the Military Maintenance complex in Koran merged with the "FAMOS" corporation and incorporated itself as "FAMOS-Koran". This merger brings further development and new work opportunities. Famos-Koran would go on to manufacture parts for heavy engines, transmissions and vehicles. Towards the end of the 1980s there were more than 2000 employees at Famos-Koran. In addition factories were add for the manufacture of engine turbos and manufacture of parts for the Mercedes Benz OM-360 engine that was built under licence.

=== Bosnian War ===
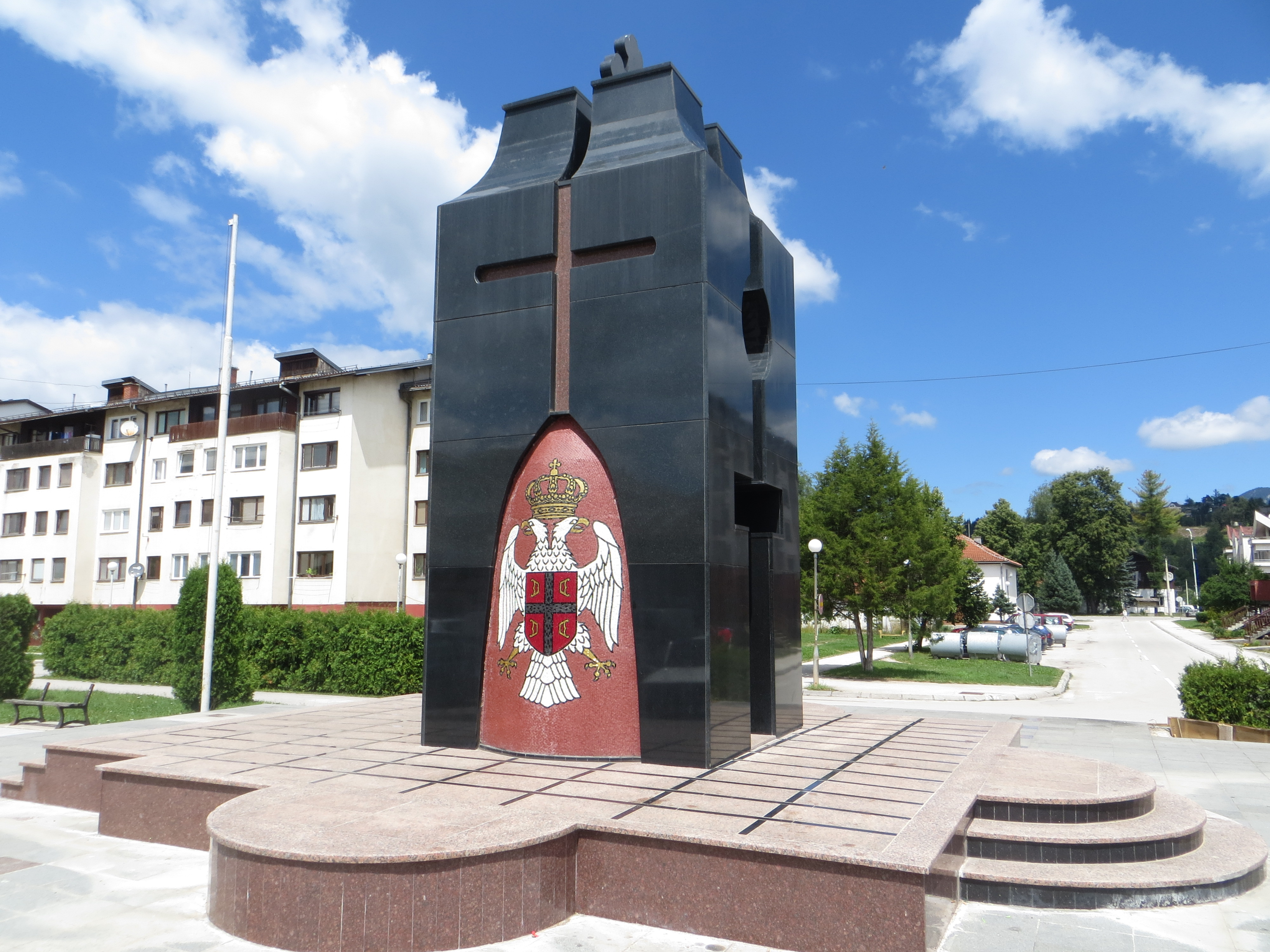
Monument dedicated to the fallen Serb fighters of the Bosnian war

During 1991 and 1992, as the tensions rose in the run up to the Bosnian War, the Pale region became an administrative center of the Republika Srpska. It would remain a center of activity for Bosnian Serb forces during their Siege of Sarajevo which led to the deaths of more than 13,000 people, including some 5,000 civilains and the wounding of 56,000 (including 15,000 children). Several high ranking Serb commanders in control of forces from the region, including General Stanislav Galić were sentenced by the International Criminal Tribunal for the former Yugoslavia (ICTY) for crimes committed against the inhabitants of Sarajevo during the siege.

The town became the nominal administrative headquarters of the Bosnian Serb government, while Banja Luka became the de facto capital. Pale remained an important cultural center with a collection of cultural and informational institutions such as a news agency (SRNA), a television station (Canal S) and newspapers (Javnost and Ognjišta) are based there.

=== Post-Dayton ===
The Bosnian War ended with the signing of the Dayton Peace accords on 14 December 1995. With the war at the end the town returned to some sort of normalcy. As the Constitution of Republika Srpska sets out that Sarajevo is the capital of Republika Srpska which was recognized as an entity of Bosnia and Herzegovina by the Dayton Peace Agreement, the administrative capital has now transferred to Banja Luka.

After the Dayton agreement was signed, an exodus of Sarajevo Serbs occurred in 1996. Some Sarajevo Serbs settled in Pale. After the war, some important faculties of University of East Sarajevo were placed in Pale.

== Settlements ==
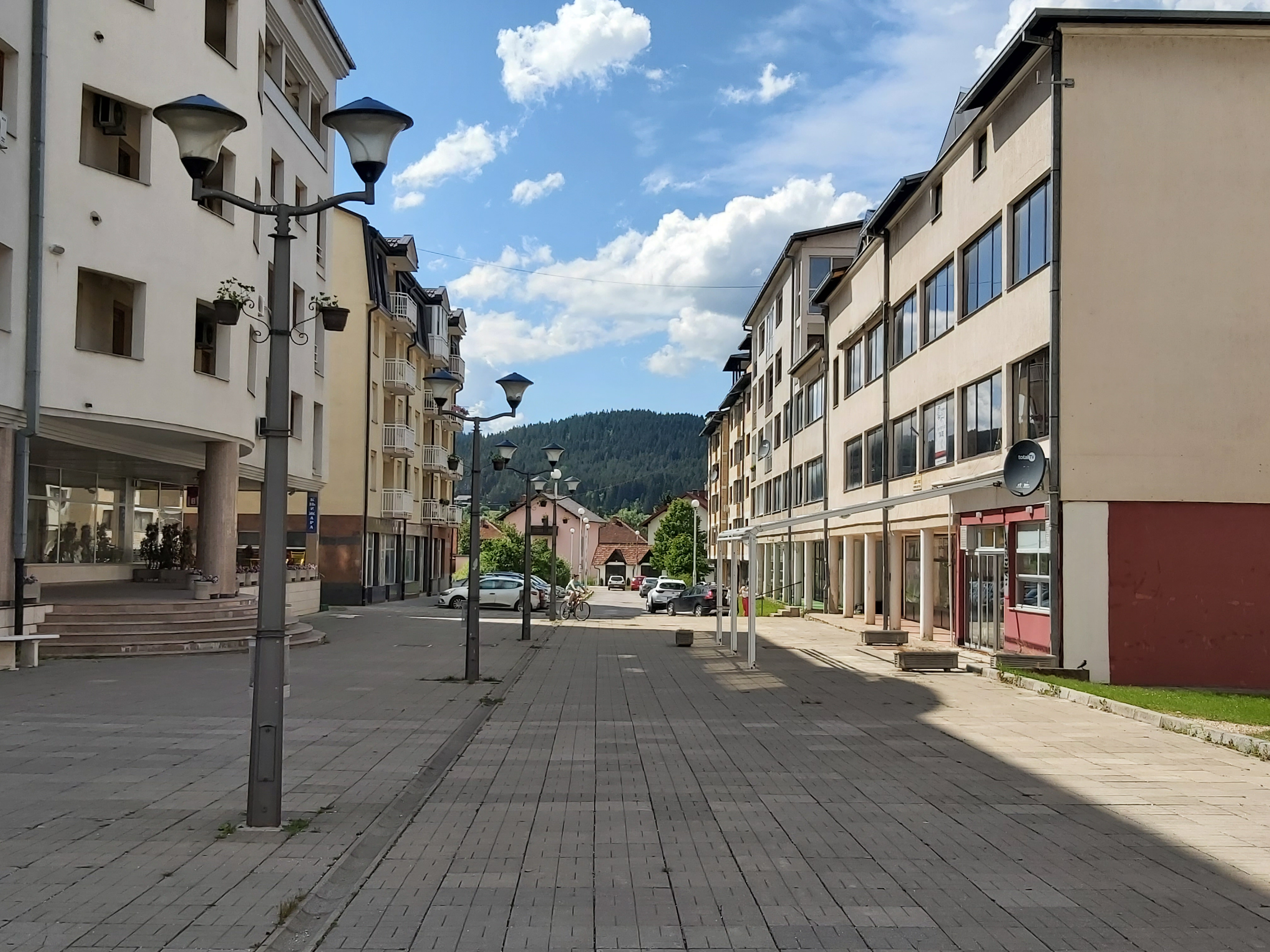
A pedestrian area

- Bjelogorci
- Bljuštevac
- Bogovići
- Brdarići
- Brdo
- Brezovice
- Brnjica
- Brojnići
- Buđ
- Čeljadinići
- Čemernica
- Ćemanovići
- Datelji
- Donja Ljubogošta
- Donja Vinča
- Gluhovići
- Gornja Ljubogošta
- Gornja Vinča
- Gornje Pale
- Gornji Pribanj
- Gorovići
- Gradac
- Gute
- Hotočina
- Jahorina
- Jasik
- Jelovci
- Kadino Selo
- Kamenica
- Kasidoli
- Komrani
- Kosmaj
- Kostreša
- Kračule
- Luke
- Miošići
- Modrik
- Mokro
- Nehorići
- Prača
- Pavlovac
- Petovići
- Podgrab
- Podloznik
- Podmedenik
- Podvitez
- Ponor
- Prača
- Prutine
- Pustopolje
- Radonjići
- Rakite
- Rakovac
- Renovica
- Rogoušići
- Rosulje
- Saice
- Sinjevo
- Sjetlina
- Srednje
- Stajna
- Stambolčić
- Strane
- Sumbulovac
- Šainovići
- Šip
- Turkovići
- Udež
- Vinograd
- Vlahovići

=== Municipal mayors ===
Municipal mayors were:

- Slobodan Kovačević, SDS (1990 — 1992)
- Zdravko Čvoro, SDS (1992 — 2000)
- Slavko Kujundžić, SDS (2000 — 2004)
- Slobodan Savić, SDS (2004 — 2012)
- Miodrag Kovačević, SDS (2012 — 2016)
- Boško Jugović, SNSD (2016 — present)

== Demographics ==
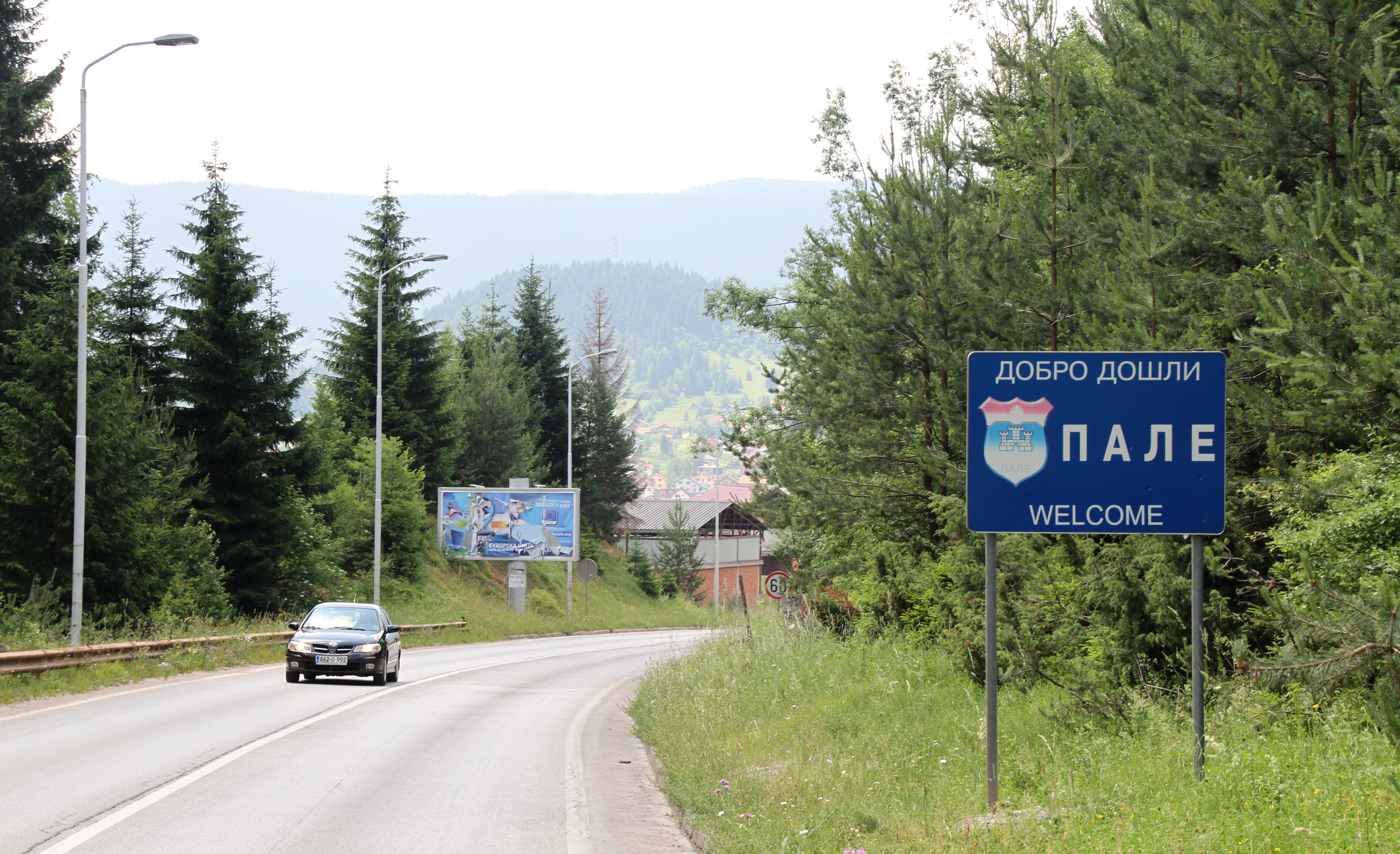
Welcome to Pale sign

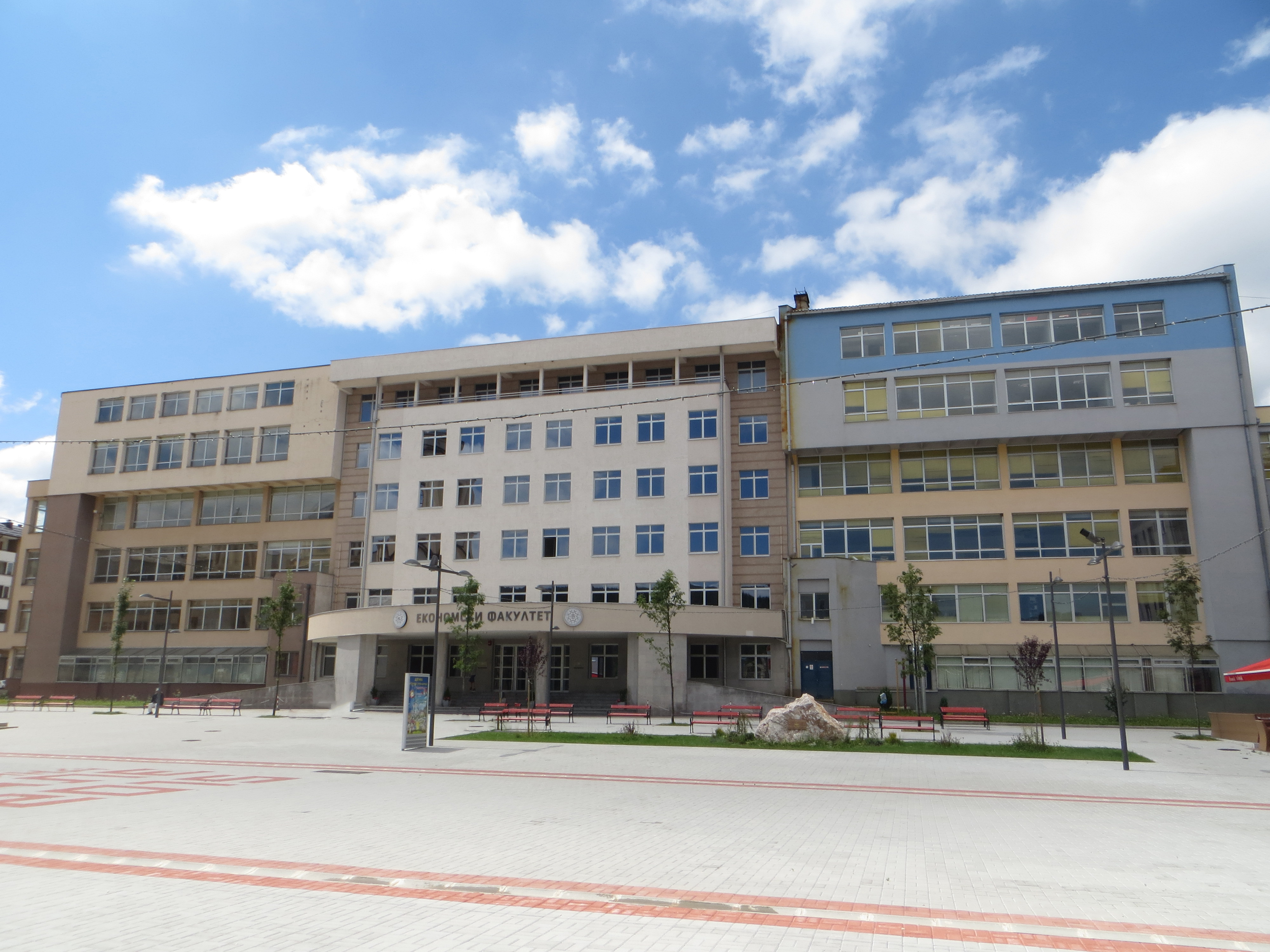
University of East Sarajevo Faculty of Economics

=== Population ===
Population of settlements – Pale municipality
	Settlement	1961.	1971.	1981.	1991.	2013.
	Total	16,477	16,119	15,482	14,480	22,282
1	Bljuštevac				128	269
2	Donja Ljubogošta				291	393
3	Gornje Pale				368	694
4	Gornji Pribanj				187	298
5	Mokro				408	811
6	Pale	1,086	1,579	2,105	7,384	13,883
7	Podgrab				722	549
8	Pustopolje				266	783
9	Rakovac				363	850
10	Rogoušići				199	468
11	Sinjevo				146	280

=== Ethnic composition ===
Ethnic composition – Pale town
	2013.	1991.	1981.	1971.	1961.
Total	13,883 (100,0%)	7,384 (100,0%)	2,105 (100,0%)	1,579 (100,0%)	1,086 (100,0%)
Serbs		5,204 (70,48%)	1,213 (57,62%)	1,059 (67,07%)	681 (62,71%)
Bosniaks		1,630 (22,07%)	521 (24,75%)	411 (26,03%)	141 (12,98%)
Yugoslavs		335 (4,537%)	294 (13,97%)	21 (1,330%)	157 (14,46%)
Croats		109 (1,476%)	36 (1,710%)	58 (3,673%)	72 (6,630%)
Others		106 (1,436%)	18 (0,855%)	7 (0,443%)	3 (0,276%)
Montenegrins			20 (0,950%)	18 (1,140%)	25 (2,302%)
Albanians			2 (0,095%)	3 (0,190%)	4 (0,368%)
Slovenes			1 (0,048%)	1 (0,063%)	1 (0,092%)
Macedonians				1 (0,063%)	2 (0,184%)

Ethnic composition – Pale municipality
	2013.	1991.	1981.	1971.	1961.
Total	22,282 (100,0%)	16,355 (100,0%)	15,482 (100,0%)	16,119 (100,0%)	16,477 (100,0%)
Serbs	20,451 (97,81%)	11,284 (68,99%)	10,530 (68,01%)	11,230 (69,67%)	11,655 (70,73%)
Bosniaks	186 (0,890%)	4,364 (26,68%)	3,937 (25,43%)	4,508 (27,97%)	2,809 (17,05%)
Others	144 (0,689%)	182 (1,113%)	56 (0,362%)	57 (0,354%)	21 (0,127%)
Croats	128 (0,612%)	129 (0,789%)	100 (0,646%)	142 (0,881%)	223 (1,353%)
Yugoslavs		396 (2,421%)	787 (5,083%)	80 (0,496%)	1 595 (9,680%)
Montenegrins			68 (0,439%)	68 (0,422%)	107 (0,649%)
Albanians			3 (0,019%)	24 (0,149%)	19 (0,115%)
Slovenes			1 (0,006%)	5 (0,031%)	19 (0,115%)
Hungarians				4 (0,025%)	13 (0,079%)
Macedonians				1 (0,006%)	16 (0,097%)

== Culture ==
An international art event called Art Symposium Jahorina was established on May 1, 2003, and ever since it has been held annually on the Olympic mountain Jahorina, hosting great numbers of artists from around the globe.

Jahorina Film Festival is annually organized since 2007.

In 2021 the City library in Pale celebrated 100 years of existence.

== Economy ==
The following table gives a preview of total number of registered people employed in legal entities per their core activity (as of 2024):

Activity	Total
Agriculture, forestry and fishing	198
Mining and quarrying	-
Manufacturing	535
Electricity, gas, steam and air conditioning supply	297
Water supply; sewerage, waste management and remediation activities	197
Construction	381
Wholesale and retail trade, repair of motor vehicles and motorcycles	604
Transportation and storage	414
Accommodation and food services	574
Information and communication	69
Financial and insurance activities	70
Real estate activities	133
Professional, scientific and technical activities	126
Administrative and support service activities	173
Public administration and defense; compulsory social security	477
Education	666
Human health and social work activities	218
Arts, entertainment and recreation	24
Other service activities	113
Total	5,269

=== Forestry ===
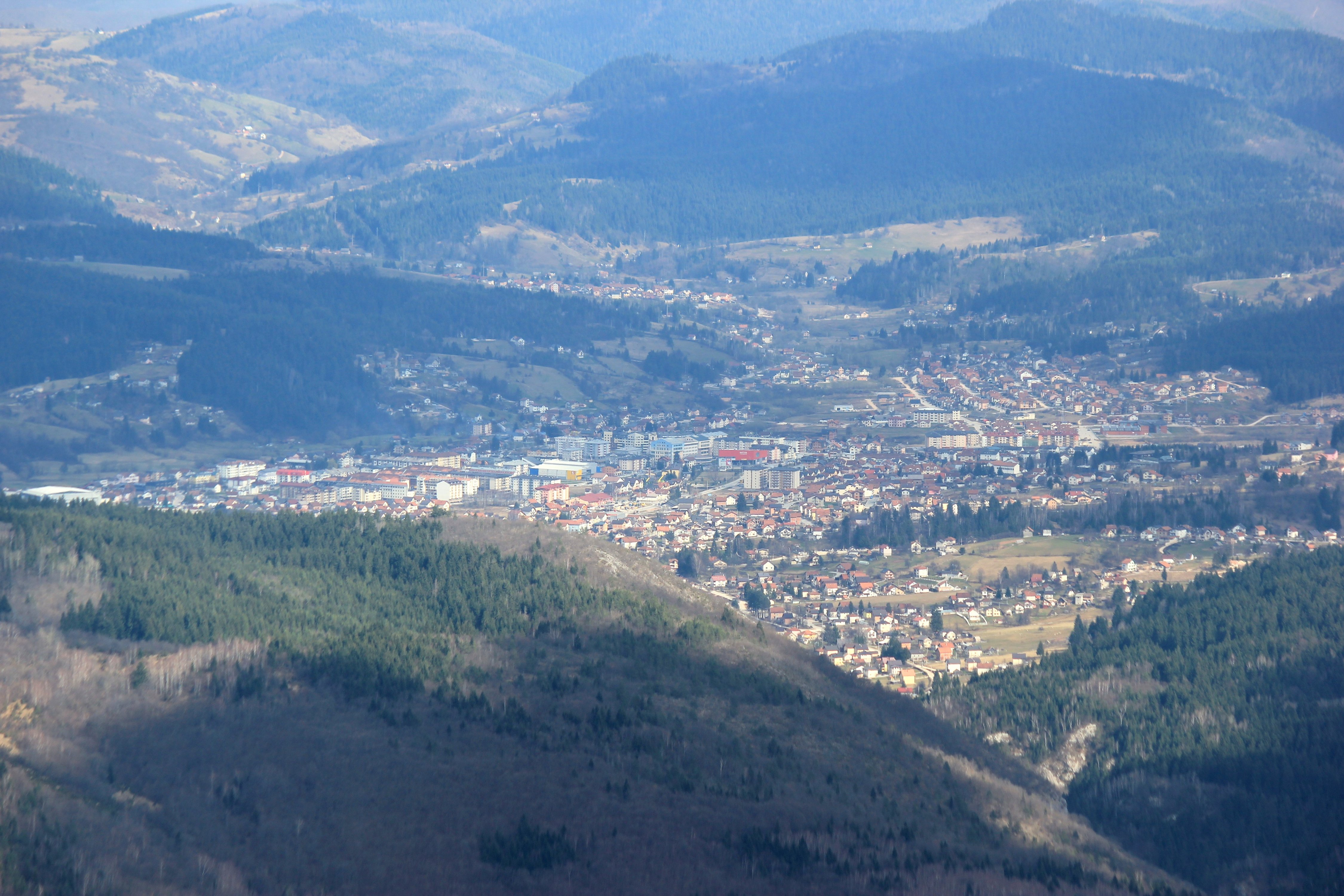
Pale from Trebević

There are more than 30 logging and wood production mills in the Pale municipality. The Wood Industry in Pale is an important part of the town's economy and number of people employed there. Currently there are too many logging facilities around in the area, exceeding the renewal capacity of nearby forests.

== Tourism ==
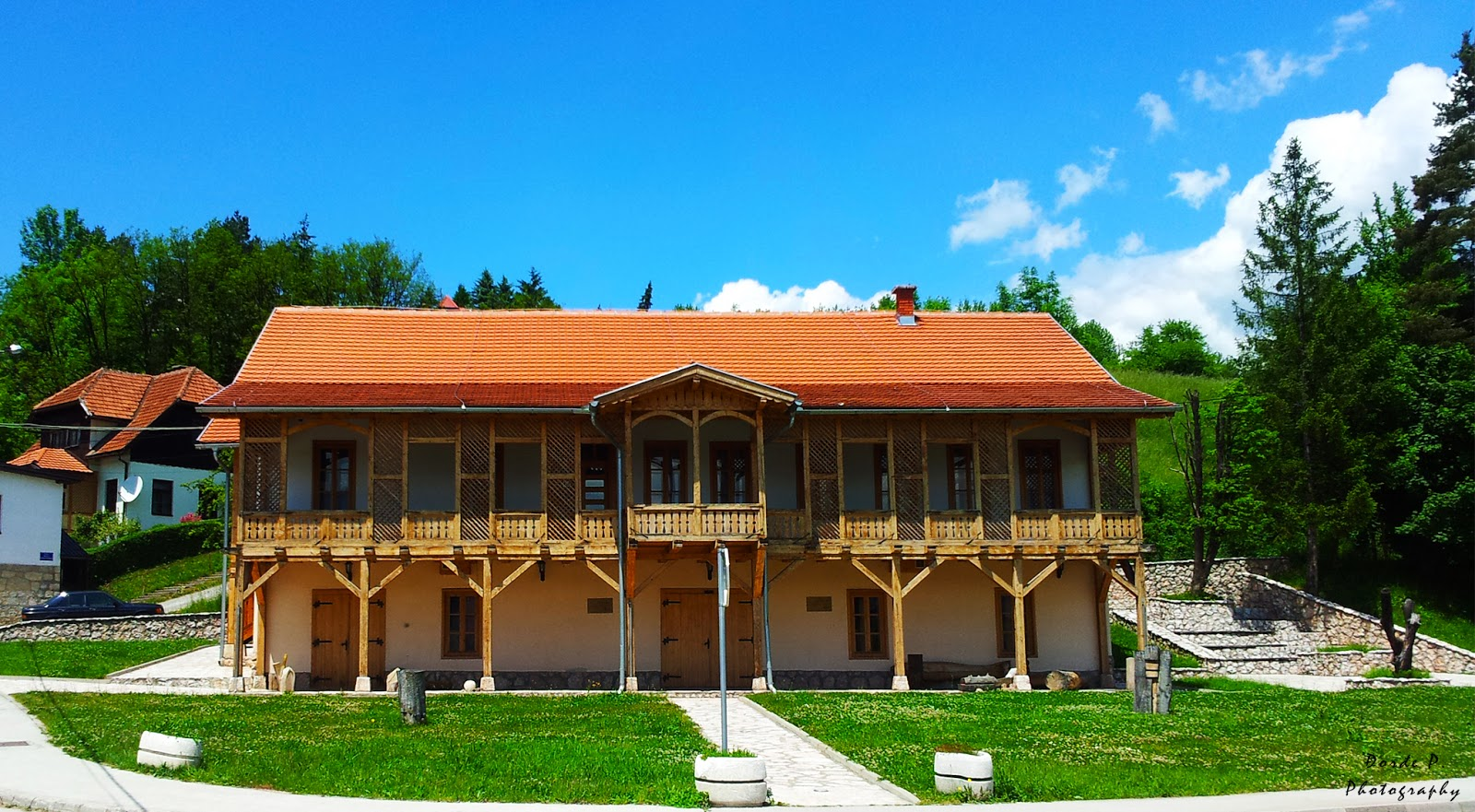
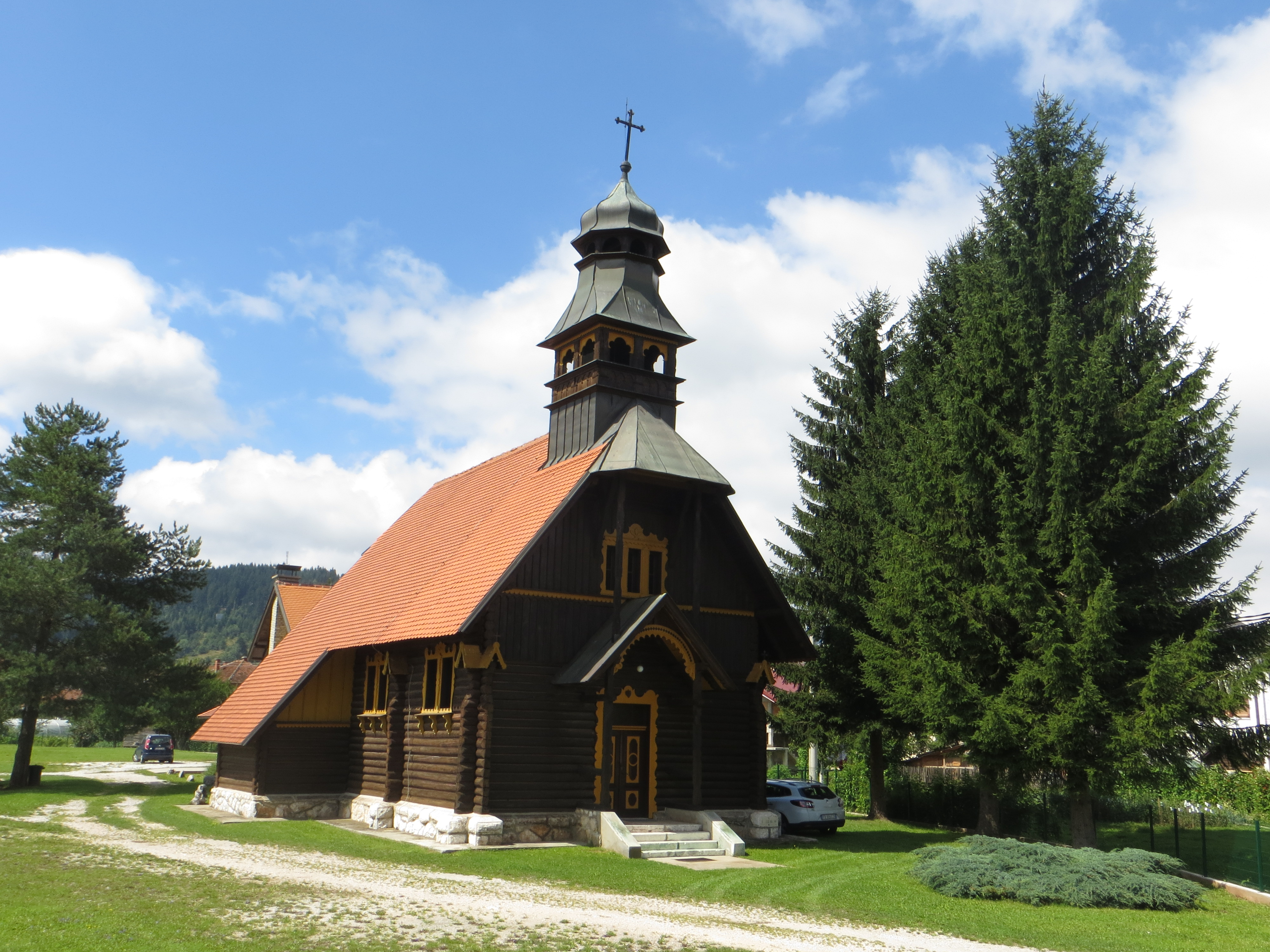
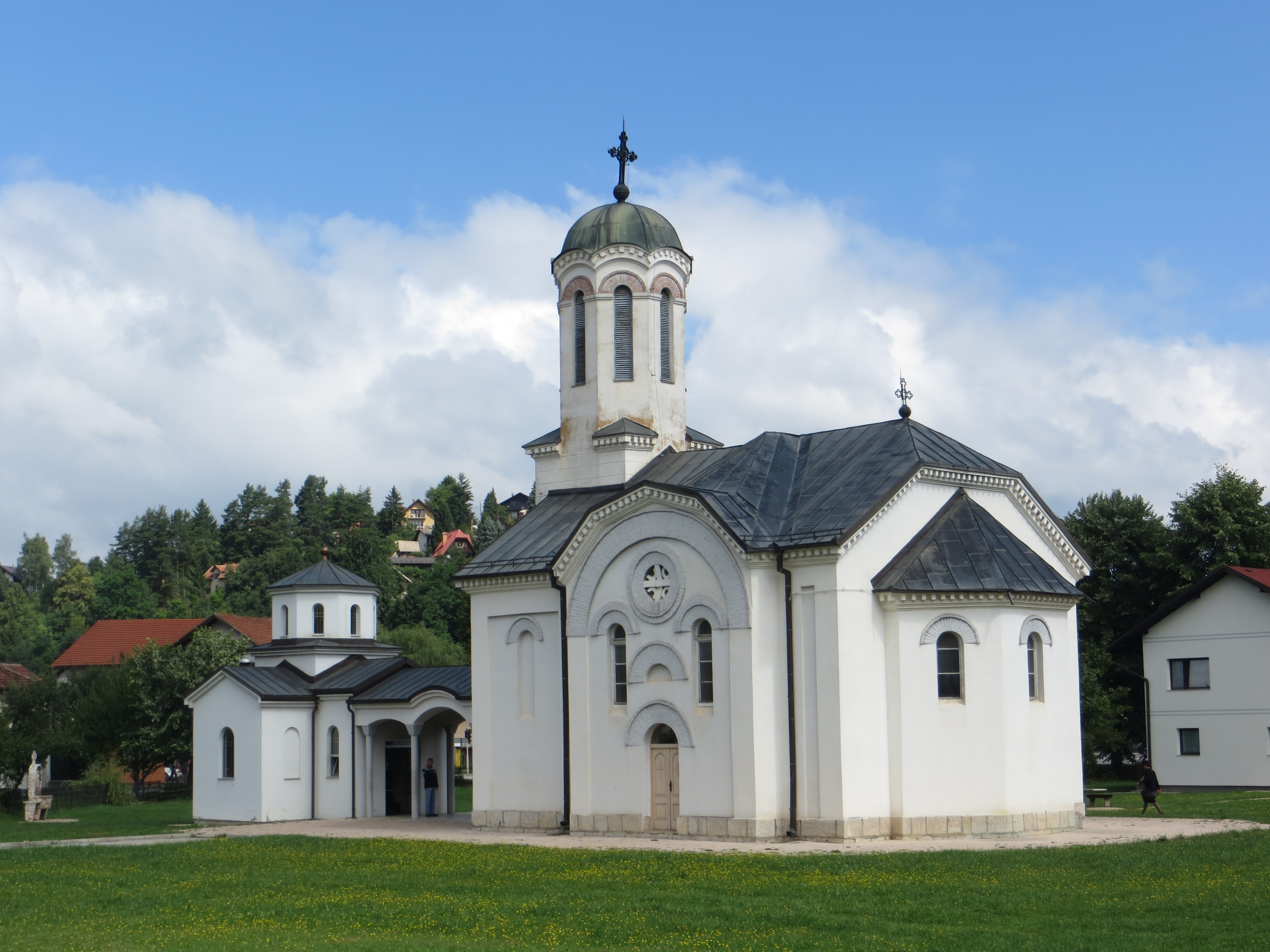
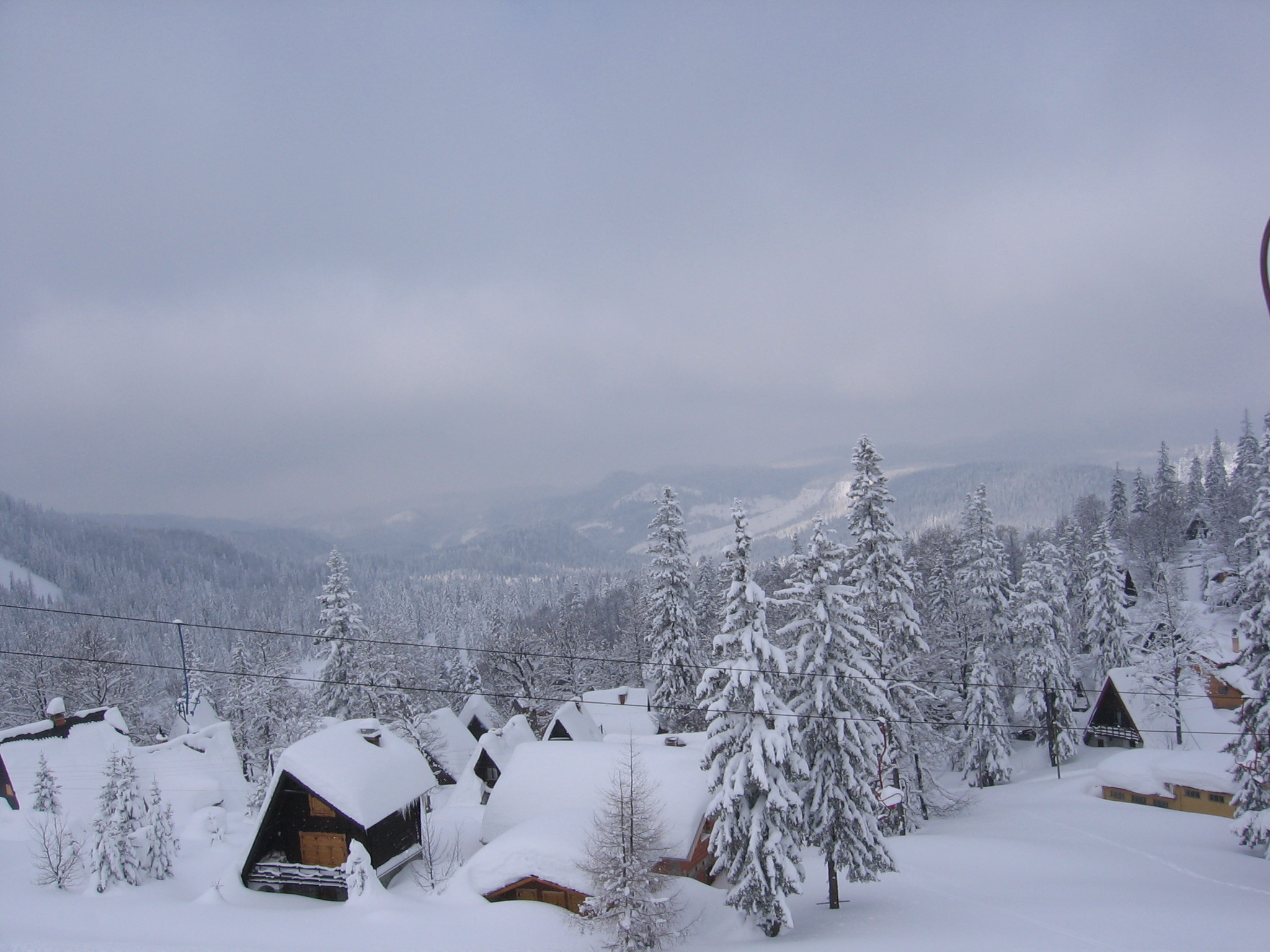
Clockwise from left: 1. Ceković house, city gallery and a protected national monument 2. Wooden Roman Catholic church. 3. Serbian Orthodox Church of Dormition of the Mother of God 4. Jahorina is the biggest ski resort in Bosnia and Herzegovina

The local economy has a significant tourism arm. The nearby mountains of Jahorina, Trebević and Igman were used during the 1984 Winter Olympics.

The Jahorina ski resort has 8 lifts and over 20 kilometres (12 miles) of ski trails all over the mountain that offer Olympic-style professional trails and novice trails for children and beginners. The high season on Jahorina is mid-December to late January. Around the new year it is almost impossible to get accommodation without advance reservations.

The Hunting Association "Jahorina Pale" administers the "Pale" hunting grounds. These hunting grounds cover more than 37,039 hectares in the Pale and Stari Grad Municipality. The hunting grounds is one of the best-kept and -equipped hunting grounds in Republika Srpska.

The hunting grounds feature three hunting lodges; two are within the county limits of Palem, the hunting lodge "Srndać" features 35 beds, while the smaller hunting lodge "Lane" features 20 beds. The hunting grounds offer different kinds of game including: Deer, Bear, Boar and Rabbits.

A significant archeological find is located at the Orlovača cave. The cave is situated only 10 km (6 miles) away from Pale and 15 km (9 miles) away from Sarajevo, at 949 metres (3,114 feet) above sea level. In 1975 the first explorers entered the cave. Consisting of 2,500 metres (8,202 ft) of explored passages and halls, Orlovača is the second-longest cave in BH ( after Vjetrenica Cave). During August and September 2002, through the initiative of the Faculty of Philosophy in Pale 500 metres (1,640 ft) of the total length of the passages with the most beautiful cave ornaments were made accessible for tourist visits.

The cave is characterized by stable microclimate conditions, during the whole year the temperature is only 8 °C (46 °F) and humidity over 90%. The variety of important signs of life discovered in the cave establishes it among the richest palaeontological sites in the region. The cave bear skeletons discovered in the cave are estimated to be over 16.000 years old. Signs of prehistoric culture were spotted on the slope leading to the main cave entrance. Dating of the remnants places them in the late Bronze Age, but remnants dating back to neolite and mezolite age are also expected to be found.

Because of its scientific and aesthetic characteristics the cave is destined to become the focus of the research and educational projects of the Faculty of Philosophy in Pale. The center is planned to be built on the banks of the Sinjeva River.

== Twin towns – sister cities ==
Pale is twinned with:

- Smederevo, Serbia
- Pomáz, Hungary

== Notable people ==
- Aleksandar Kosorić, footballer
- Goran Trobok, Serbian footballer
- Jelena Lolović, Serbian alpine skier
- Ognjen Koroman, Serbian footballer
- Trifko Grabež, (1895–1916) member of Young Bosnia (which included Gavrilo Princip), a group which was associated with the Black Hand; charged with treason and murder, alongside other members of Young Bosnia, over the assassination of Archduke Franz Ferdinand of Austria and his wife Sophie, Duchess of Hohenberg
- Žana Novaković, alpine skier
