= Brnjica =

Brnjica may refer to:

- Brnjica (Pale), a village in Bosnia and Herzegovina
- Brnjica, Živinice, a village in Bosnia and Herzegovina
- Brnjica, Croatia, a village near Skradin, Croatia
- Brnjica (Golubac), a village in Serbia
- Brnjica (Knić), a village in Serbia
- Brnjica (Sjenica), a village in Serbia
