= Bulozi =

Bulozi may refer to:

== Bosnia and Herzegovina ==
- Bulozi, Pale-Prača, a village
- Bulozi, Istočni Stari Grad, a village
- Bulozi, Rogatica, a village

== Africa ==
- Barotseland (Lozi: Mubuso Bulozi), a region of south-central Africa, including most of Zambia and parts of neighboring countries
- Bulozi Plain, or Barotse Floodplain, a floodplain of the Zambezi in Zambia, associated with the Lozi people and language
