= Vinograd (Pale) =

Vinograd Виноград
- Village
- Location within Bosnia and Herzegovina
- Coordinates: 43°47′20″N 18°47′18″E
- Country: Bosnia and Herzegovina
- Entity: Republika Srpska
- Municipality: Pale

Population (2013)
  - Total: 35
- Time zone: UTC+1 (CET)
  - Summer (DST): UTC+2 (CEST)
- Area code: (+387) 57

Vinograd (Serbian pronunciation: [ʋǐnoɡraːd]; Serbian Cyrillic: Виноград) is a village in the municipality of Pale in Bosnia and Herzegovina. It lies in the entity of Republika Srpska. It is located to the north of Gornja Vinča and to the south of Ponor.
