= Sumbul =

Sumbul or Sumbal may refer to:

- Sumbal, Jammu and Kashmir, a town of Jammu and Kashmir
- Muskroot or Sumbul, a drug derived from the Uzbek plant Ferula sumbul
- Sumbul (name)

== See also ==
- Sumbala, an African cuisine
- Sumbulovac, a village of Pale, Bosnia and Herzegovina
