= Bjelogorci =

Bjelogorci may refer to:

- Bjelogorci (Pale)
- Bjelogorci (Rogatica)
