= Gute =

Gute may refer to:

== People ==
- Gotlanders, population of the island of Gotland

== Places ==
- Gute (Pale), a village in the municipality of Pale, Bosnia and Herzegovina
- Gute, Gotland, a settlement in Sweden

== Other ==
- Gute sheep, landrace breed of domestic sheep native to the Swedish island of Gotland
- Gute Zeiten, schlechte Zeiten a German television soap opera

== See also ==
- Gute Nacht (disambiguation)
