= Brdarići =

Brdarići Брдарићи
- Village
- Location within Bosnia and Herzegovina
- Coordinates: 43°44′26″N 18°44′47″E
- Country: Bosnia and Herzegovina
- Entity: Federation of Bosnia and Herzegovina
- Region Canton: East Sarajevo; Bosnian-Podrinje Goražde
- Municipality: Pale; Pale-Prača

Area
  - Total: 2.35 sq mi (6.09 km^{2})

Population (2013)
  - Total: 20
  - Density: 8.5/sq mi (3.3/km^{2})
- Time zone: UTC+1 (CET)
  - Summer (DST): UTC+2 (CEST)

Brdarići (Serbian Cyrillic: Брдарићи) is a village in the municipalities of Pale, Republika Srpska and Pale-Prača, Bosnia and Herzegovina.

== Demographics ==
According to the 2013 census, its population was 20, all Bosniaks living in the Pale-Prača part thus none in the Republika Srpska part.
