= Srednje (Pale) =

Srednje Средње
- Village
- Location within Bosnia and Herzegovina
- Coordinates: 43°43′11″N 18°43′01″E
- Country: Bosnia and Herzegovina
- Entity: Federation of Bosnia and Herzegovina
- Region Canton: East Sarajevo; Bosnian-Podrinje Goražde
- Municipality: Pale; Pale-Prača

Area
  - Total: 3.81 sq mi (9.87 km^{2})

Population (2013)
  - Total: 3
  - Density: 0.79/sq mi (0.30/km^{2})
- Time zone: UTC+1 (CET)
  - Summer (DST): UTC+2 (CEST)

Srednje (Serbian Cyrillic: Средње) is a village in the municipalities of Pale, Republika Srpska and Pale-Prača, Bosnia and Herzegovina.

== Demographics ==
According to the 2013 census, its population was 3, all Serbs living in the Republika Srpska part, thus none in the Pale-Prača part.
