= Kamenica (Pale) =

Kamenica Каменица
- Village
- Location within Bosnia and Herzegovina
- Coordinates: 43.6997°N 18.7111°E
- Country: Bosnia and Herzegovina
- Entity: Federation of Bosnia and Herzegovina
- Region Canton: East Sarajevo; Bosnian-Podrinje Goražde
- Municipality: Pale; Pale-Prača

Area
  - Total: 7.56 sq mi (19.59 km^{2})

Population (2013)
  - Total: 2
  - Density: 0.26/sq mi (0.10/km^{2})
- Time zone: UTC+1 (CET)
  - Summer (DST): UTC+2 (CEST)

Kamenica (Serbian Cyrillic: Каменица) is a village in the municipalities of Pale, Republika Srpska and Pale-Prača, Bosnia and Herzegovina.

== Demographics ==
According to the 2013 census, its population was 2, both Bosniaks living in the Republika Srpska part, thus none in the Pale-Prača part.
