= Vražalice =

- Village
- Location within Bosnia and Herzegovina
- Coordinates: 43.7537°N 18.8999°E
- Country: Bosnia and Herzegovina
- Entity: Federation of Bosnia and Herzegovina
- Region Canton: East Sarajevo; Bosnian-Podrinje Goražde
- Municipality: Rogatica; Pale-Prača

Area
  - Total: 5.19 sq mi (13.44 km^{2})

Population (2013)
  - Total: 11
  - Density: 2.1/sq mi (0.82/km^{2})
- Time zone: UTC+1 (CET)
  - Summer (DST): UTC+2 (CEST)

Vražalice is a village in the municipalities of Rogatica, Republika Srpska and Pale-Prača, Bosnia and Herzegovina.

== Demographics ==
According to the 2013 census, its population was 11, all Bosniaks living in the Pale-Prača part thus none in the Rogatica part.
