= Kasidoli, Pale =

Kasidoli Касидоли
- Village
- Location within Bosnia and Herzegovina
- Coordinates: 43°45′19″N 18°31′26″E
- Country: Bosnia and Herzegovina
- Entity: Republika Srpska
- Municipality: Pale
- Time zone: UTC+1 (CET)
  - Summer (DST): UTC+2 (CEST)

Kasidoli (Serbian Cyrillic: Касидоли) is a village in the municipality of Pale, Bosnia and Herzegovina.
