= Podloznik =

Podloznik Подлозник
- Village
- Location within Bosnia and Herzegovina
- Coordinates: 44°08′N 19°24′E
- Country: Bosnia and Herzegovina
- Entity: Republika Srpska
- Municipality: Pale
- Time zone: UTC+1 (CET)
  - Summer (DST): UTC+2 (CEST)

Podloznik (Serbian Cyrillic: Подлозник) is a village in the municipality of Pale, Bosnia and Herzegovina.
