= Hodidjed =

Ruined medieval fort in Bosnia and Herzegovina

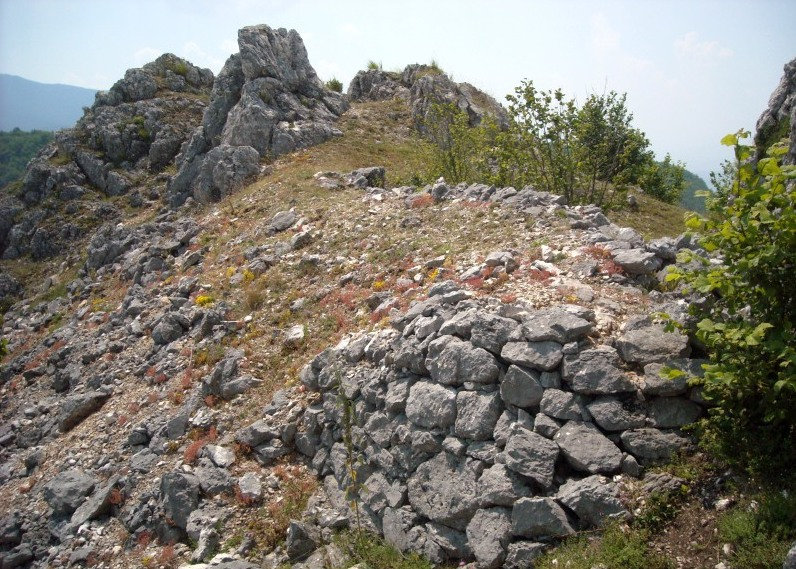
- Remains of Austro-Hungarianbunker on the site of Hodidjed

- Location within Bosnia and Herzegovina
- Interactive map of Hodidjed
- 43°51′34″N 18°29′26″E
- Type: Fort
- Location: Bulozi, Istočni Stari Grad

History
- Abandoned: c. 17 AD

Hodidjed (Serbian Cyrillic: Ходиђед) is a ruined medieval fort located in Bulozi, Republika Srpska, Bosnia and Herzegovina.

Hodidjed was the only known fortification in the area of Vrhbosna župa in the High Middle Ages. The fort, located at Han Bulog east of Sarajevo, was first taken by the Ottoman Empire between 1428 and 1430, then retaken by Matko Talovac in 1434, and then taken again by Barak Isaković in 1435.

== History ==
Hodidjed is first mentioned in historical documents in 1428, after being conquered by the Ottoman Empire. It was briefly recaptured by a Croatian Ban Matko Talovac, but in 1435 it was conquered by Isa Bey Isaković and fell to the Ottomans again. According to an Ottoman document dating from 1455. Hodidjed had a dizdar (a gatekeeper of the fort) and a garrison of 23 soldiers. The settlement near Hodidjed by the name of Bulagaj was registered as a village. It is presumed that that village perished in a fire started by king Tomaš in 1459, upon his unsuccessful attempt to regain Hodidjed.

In 1550 the garrison consisted of 50 soldiers. The garrison was stationed here until somewhere between 1811 and 1833, when it relocated to Bijela Tabija above Sarajevo.

According to the document from 1565., 26,3 kilograms of silver were buried in Hodidjed. It is assumed that a fort was also utilized as a coin mint, and also a dungeon.

There are certain indications that the exact location of Hodidjed was on the locality of today's Bijela Tabija, but according to other sources Hodidjed was located at the village of Buloz. According to the former theory, Bijela Tabija fort actually was built on the foundations of Hodidjed in the early 18th. century, during a period of fortifying already existing fortifications of Sarajevo after the assault of prince Eugene of Savoy.
