= Stambolčić =

Stambolčić Стамболчић
- Village
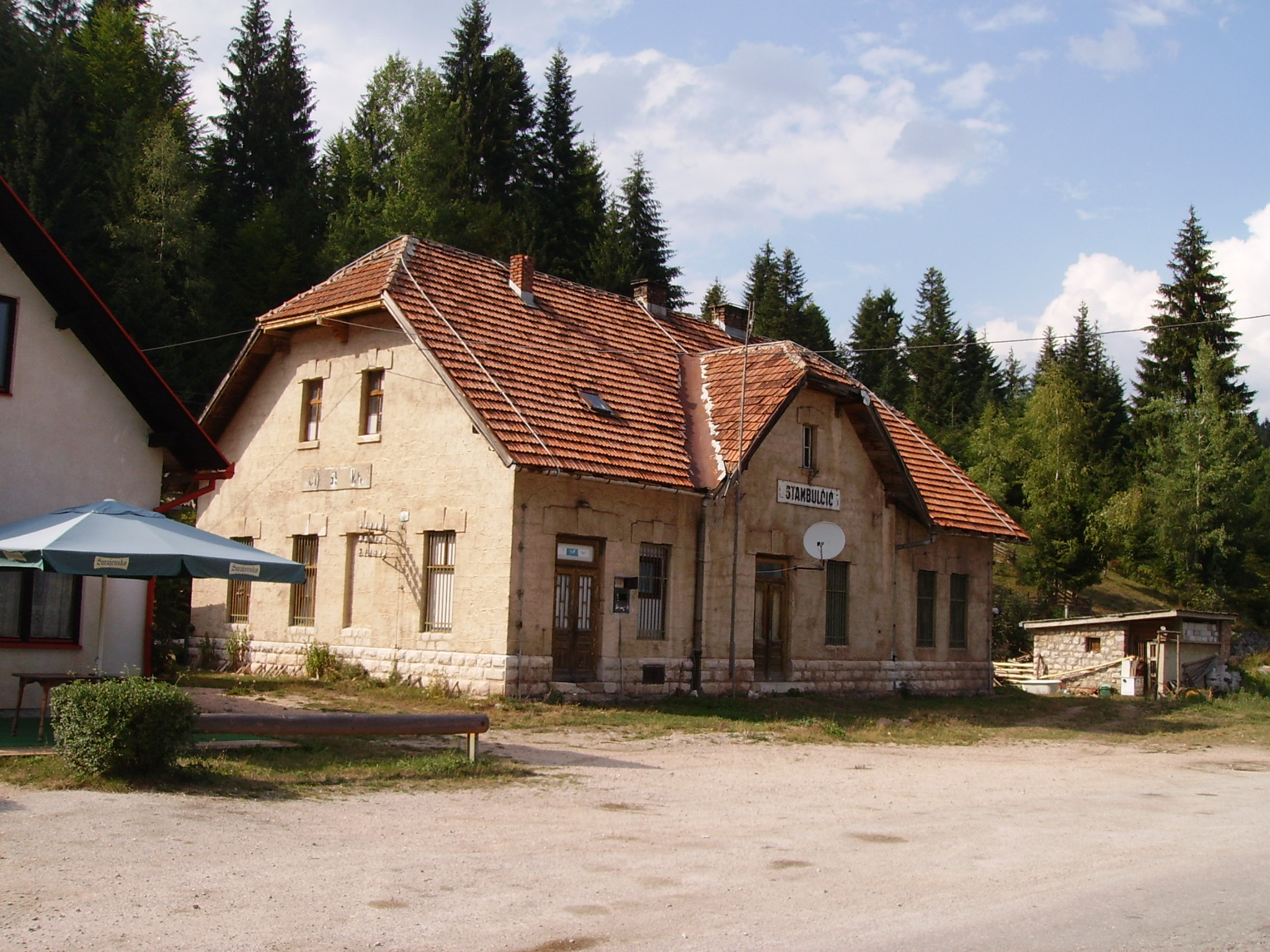
- Former railway station of Stambulčić

- Location within Bosnia and Herzegovina
- Coordinates: 43°47′31″N 18°38′04″E
- Country: Bosnia and Herzegovina
- Entity: Republika Srpska
- Municipality: Pale
- Time zone: UTC+1 (CET)
  - Summer (DST): UTC+2 (CEST)

Stambolčić (Serbian Cyrillic: Стамболчић) is a village in the municipality of Pale, Bosnia and Herzegovina.
