= Brojnići =

Brojnići Бројнићи
- Village
- Location within Bosnia and Herzegovina
- Coordinates: 43°45′N 18°51′E
- Country: Bosnia and Herzegovina
- Entity: Federation of Bosnia and Herzegovina
- Canton: Bosnian-Podrinje Goražde
- Municipality: Pale-Prača

Area
  - Total: 3.26 sq mi (8.45 km^{2})

Population (2013)
  - Total: 27
  - Density: 8.3/sq mi (3.2/km^{2})
- Time zone: UTC+1 (CET)
  - Summer (DST): UTC+2 (CEST)

Brojnići (Serbian Cyrillic: Бројнићи) is a village in the municipality of Pale-Prača, Bosnia and Herzegovina.

== Demographics ==
According to the 2013 census, its population was 27.

Ethnicity in 2013
| Ethnicity | Number | Percentage |
|---|---|---|
| Bosniaks | 24 | 88.9% |
| other/undeclared | 3 | 11.1% |
| Total | 27 | 100% |
