= Jahorina (Pale) =

Jahorina Јахорина
- village
- Location within Bosnia and Herzegovina
- Coordinates: 43°44′N 18°34′E
- Country: Bosnia and Herzegovina
- Entity: Republika Srpska
- Municipality: Pale
- Time zone: UTC+1 (CET)
  - Summer (DST): UTC+2 (CEST)

Jahorina (Serbian Cyrillic: Јахорина) is a village in the municipality of Pale, Bosnia and Herzegovina.
