= Gluhovići =

Gluhovići Глуховићи
- Village
- Location within Bosnia and Herzegovina
- Coordinates: 43°49′N 18°42′E
- Country: Bosnia and Herzegovina
- Entity: Republika Srpska
- Municipality: Pale
- Time zone: UTC+1 (CET)
  - Summer (DST): UTC+2 (CEST)

Gluhovići (Serbian Cyrillic: Глуховићи) is a village in the municipality of Pale, Bosnia and Herzegovina.
