= Luke (Pale) =

- Village
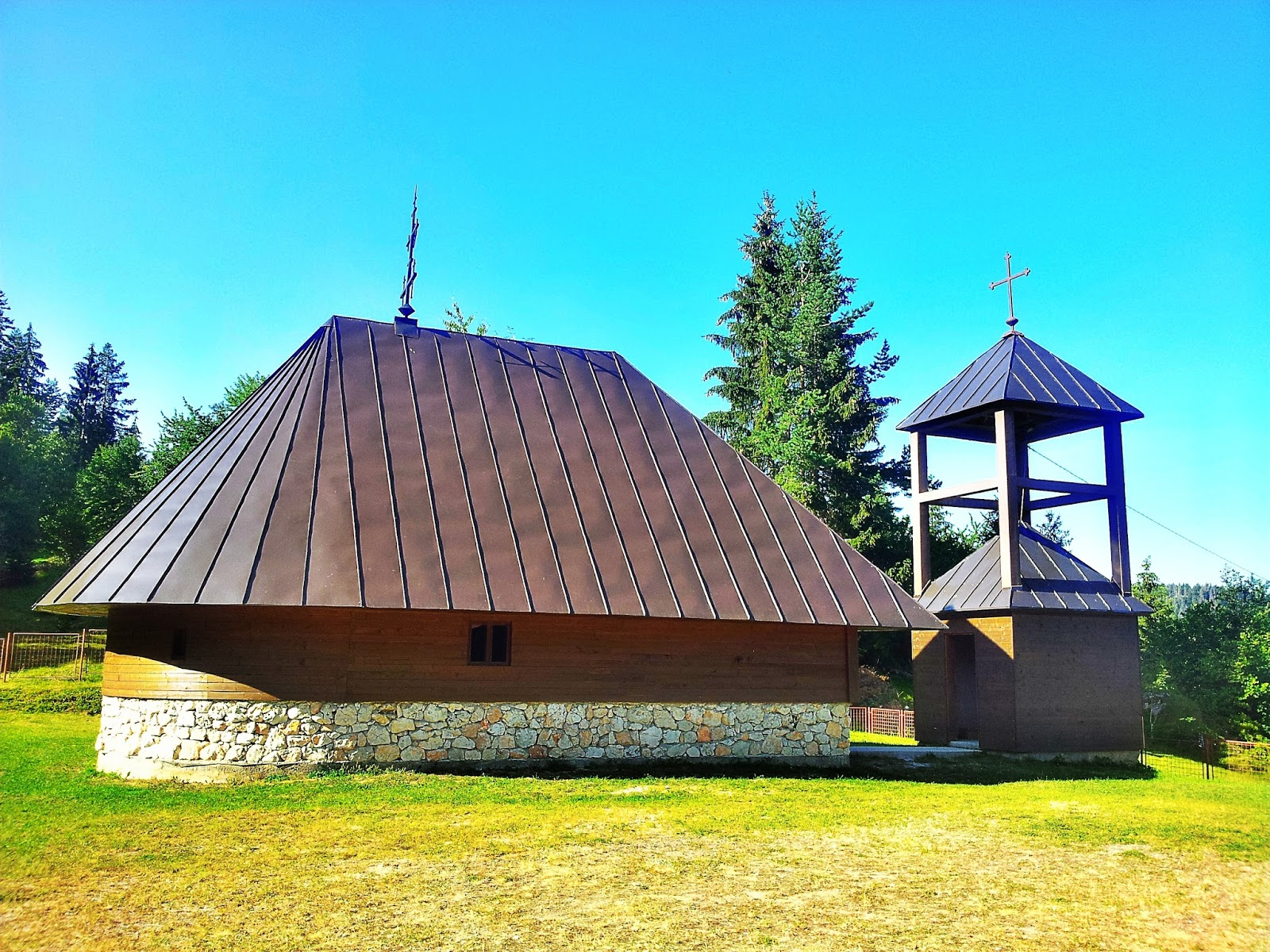
- Church in village Luke

- Location within Bosnia and Herzegovina
- Coordinates: 43°47′41″N 18°29′10″E
- Country: Bosnia and Herzegovina
- Entity: Republika Srpska
- Municipality: Pale
- Time zone: UTC+1 (CET)
  - Summer (DST): UTC+2 (CEST)

Luke (Serbian: Луке) is a village in the municipality of Pale, Bosnia and Herzegovina.
