= Turkovići (Pale) =

Turkovići Турковићи
- Village
- Location within Bosnia and Herzegovina
- Coordinates: 43°45′27″N 18°49′27″E
- Country: Bosnia and Herzegovina
- Entity: Federation of Bosnia and Herzegovina
- Canton: Bosnian-Podrinje Goražde
- Municipality: Pale-Prača

Area
  - Total: 0.79 sq mi (2.05 km^{2})

Population (2013)
  - Total: 169
  - Density: 214/sq mi (82.4/km^{2})
- Time zone: UTC+1 (CET)
  - Summer (DST): UTC+2 (CEST)

Turkovići (Serbian Cyrillic: Турковићи) is a village in the municipality of Pale-Prača, Bosnia and Herzegovina.

== Demographics ==
According to the 2013 census, its population was 169.

Ethnicity in 2013
| Ethnicity | Number | Percentage |
|---|---|---|
| Bosniaks | 165 | 97.6% |
| other/undeclared | 4 | 2.4% |
| Total | 169 | 100% |
