= Strane, Pale =

Strane Стране
- Village
- Location within Bosnia and Herzegovina
- Coordinates: 43°46′22″N 18°50′18″E
- Country: Bosnia and Herzegovina
- Entity: Republika Srpska
- Municipality: Pale
- Time zone: UTC+1 (CET)
  - Summer (DST): UTC+2 (CEST)

Strane (Serbian Cyrillic: Стране) is a village in the municipality of Pale, Bosnia and Herzegovina.
