= Pavlovac, Pale =

Pavlovac Павловац
- Village
- Location within Bosnia and Herzegovina
- Coordinates: 43°46′16″N 18°29′41″E
- Country: Bosnia and Herzegovina
- Entity: Republika Srpska
- Municipality: Pale

Population (2013)
  - Total: 6
- Time zone: UTC+1 (CET)
  - Summer (DST): UTC+2 (CEST)

Pavlovac (Serbian Cyrillic: Павловац) is a village that is located in the municipality of Pale, Bosnia and Herzegovina.
