= Sinjevo =

- Village
- Location within Bosnia and Herzegovina
- Coordinates: 43°53′08″N 18°35′25″E
- Country: Bosnia and Herzegovina
- Entity: Republika Srpska
- Municipality: Pale
- Time zone: UTC+1 (CET)
  - Summer (DST): UTC+2 (CEST)

Sinjevo (Serbian: Сињево) is a village in the municipality of Pale, Bosnia and Herzegovina.
