= Brezovice (Pale) =

Brezovice Брезовице
- Village
- Location within Bosnia and Herzegovina
- Coordinates: 43°53′07″N 18°32′45″E
- Country: Bosnia and Herzegovina
- Entity: Republika Srpska
- Municipality: Pale
- Time zone: UTC+1 (CET)
  - Summer (DST): UTC+2 (CEST)

Brezovice (Serbian Cyrillic: Брезовице) is a village in the municipality of Pale, Bosnia and Herzegovina.
