= Bogovići, Bosnia and Herzegovina =

Bogovići Боговићи
- Village
- Location within Bosnia and Herzegovina
- Coordinates: 43°51′32″N 18°43′18″E
- Country: Bosnia and Herzegovina
- Entity: Republika Srpska
- Municipality: Pale
- Time zone: UTC+1 (CET)
  - Summer (DST): UTC+2 (CEST)

Bogovići (Serbian Cyrillic: Боговићи) is a village in the municipality of Pale, Bosnia and Herzegovina.
