= Rosulje (Pale) =

- Village
- Location within Bosnia and Herzegovina
- Coordinates: 43°50′29″N 18°41′17″E
- Country: Bosnia and Herzegovina
- Entity: Republika Srpska
- Municipality: Pale
- Time zone: UTC+1 (CET)
  - Summer (DST): UTC+2 (CEST)

Rosulje (Serbian: Росуље) is a village in the municipality of Pale, Bosnia and Herzegovina.
