= Ponor (Pale) =

Ponor Понор
- Village
- Location within Bosnia and Herzegovina
- Coordinates: 43°48′51″N 18°47′24″E
- Country: Bosnia and Herzegovina
- Entity: Republika Srpska
- Municipality: Pale
- Time zone: UTC+1 (CET)
  - Summer (DST): UTC+2 (CEST)

Ponor (Serbian Cyrillic: Понор) is a village in the municipality of Pale, Bosnia and Herzegovina.
