= Gute (Pale) =

Gute Гуте
- Village
- Location within Bosnia and Herzegovina
- Coordinates: 43°44′N 18°39′E
- Country: Bosnia and Herzegovina
- Entity: Republika Srpska
- Municipality: Pale
- Time zone: UTC+1 (CET)
  - Summer (DST): UTC+2 (CEST)

Gute (Serbian Cyrillic: Гуте) is a village in the municipality of Pale, Bosnia and Herzegovina.
