= Bjelogorci (Rogatica) =

Bjelogorci Бјелогорци
- Village
- Location within Bosnia and Herzegovina
- Coordinates: 43°46′57″N 19°02′39″E
- Country: Bosnia and Herzegovina
- Entity: Republika Srpska
- Municipality: Rogatica
- Time zone: UTC+1 (CET)
  - Summer (DST): UTC+2 (CEST)

Bjelogorci (Serbian Cyrillic: Бјелогорци) is a village in the Republika Srpska, Bosnia and Herzegovina. According to the 1991 census, the village is located in the municipality of Rogatica.
