= Gute Nacht =

Gute Nacht may refer to:

- Gute Nacht, the first scene in Winterreise, a song cycle for voice and piano written by Franz Schubert and published in 1828
- Gute Nacht, also known as Warum bist du so ferne, a serenade written by Adolf Eduard Marschner
- Gute Nacht, a song by German punk band Die Ärzte, originally released on the 1983 EP Zu schön, um wahr zu sein! then in as the B-side of the 1989 single Teenager Liebe
- Gute Nacht (album)
