= Bulozi, Rogatica =

Coordinates: 43.7261°N 18.8860°E

Bulozi Булози
- Village
- Interactive map of Bulozi
- Country: Bosnia and Herzegovina
- Entity: Republika Srpska
- Municipality: Rogatica
- Time zone: UTC+1 (CET)
  - Summer (DST): UTC+2 (CEST)

Bulozi (Serbian Cyrillic: Булози) is a village in the Republika Srpska, Bosnia and Herzegovina. According to the 1991 census, the village is located in the municipality of Rogatica.
