= Brnjica, Živinice =

Brnjica
- Village
- Location within Bosnia and Herzegovina
- Coordinates: 44.3816°N 18.6355°E
- Country: Bosnia and Herzegovina
- Entity: Federation of Bosnia and Herzegovina
- Canton: Tuzla
- Municipality: Živinice

Area
  - Total: 2.61 sq mi (6.75 km^{2})

Population (2013)
  - Total: 390
  - Density: 150/sq mi (58/km^{2})
- Time zone: UTC+1 (CET)
  - Summer (DST): UTC+2 (CEST)

Brnjica is a village in the municipality of Živinice, Bosnia and Herzegovina.

== Demographics ==
According to the 2013 census, its population was 390.

Ethnicity in 2013
Ethnicity	Number	Percentage
Bosniaks	385	98.7%
other/undeclared	5	1.3%
Total	390	100%
