= Datelji =

- Village
- Location within Bosnia and Herzegovina
- Coordinates: 43°43′59″N 18°45′42″E
- Country: Bosnia and Herzegovina
- Entity: Federation of Bosnia and Herzegovina
- Canton: Bosnian-Podrinje Goražde
- Municipality: Pale-Prača

Area
  - Total: 2.95 sq mi (7.63 km^{2})

Population (2013)
  - Total: 112
  - Density: 38.0/sq mi (14.7/km^{2})
- Time zone: UTC+1 (CET)
  - Summer (DST): UTC+2 (CEST)

Datelji is a village in the municipality of Pale-Prača, Bosnia and Herzegovina.

== Demographics ==
According to the 2013 census, its population was 112, all Bosniaks.
