= Bulozi, Pale-Prača =

Bulozi
- Village
- Location within Bosnia and Herzegovina
- Coordinates: 43.72615°N 18.886°E
- Country: Bosnia and Herzegovina
- Entity: Federation of Bosnia and Herzegovina
- Canton: Bosnian-Podrinje Goražde
- Municipality: Pale-Prača

Area
  - Total: 4.19 sq mi (10.85 km^{2})

Population (2013)
  - Total: 6
  - Density: 1.4/sq mi (0.55/km^{2})
- Time zone: UTC+1 (CET)
  - Summer (DST): UTC+2 (CEST)

Bulozi is a village in the municipality of Pale-Prača, Bosnia and Herzegovina.

== Demographics ==
According to the 2013 census, its population was six, all Bosniaks.
