= Brnjica (Pale) =

Brnjica Брњица
- Village
- Location within Bosnia and Herzegovina
- Coordinates: 43°47′57″N 18°46′31″E
- Country: Bosnia and Herzegovina
- Entity: Republika Srpska
- Municipality: Pale
- Time zone: UTC+1 (CET)
  - Summer (DST): UTC+2 (CEST)

Brnjica (Serbian Cyrillic: Брњица) is a village in the municipality of Pale, Bosnia and Herzegovina.
