= Šainovići =

- Village
- Location within Bosnia and Herzegovina
- Coordinates: 43°45′38″N 18°47′20″E
- Country: Bosnia and Herzegovina
- Entity: Federation of Bosnia and Herzegovina
- Canton: Bosnian-Podrinje Goražde
- Municipality: Pale-Prača

Area
  - Total: 2.27 sq mi (5.87 km^{2})

Population (2013)
  - Total: 111
  - Density: 49.0/sq mi (18.9/km^{2})
- Time zone: UTC+1 (CET)
  - Summer (DST): UTC+2 (CEST)

Šainovići is a village in the municipality of Pale-Prača, Bosnia and Herzegovina. According to the 2013 census, the village has a population of 111.

== Demographics ==
According to the 2013 census, its population was 111.

Ethnicity in 2013
Ethnicity	Number	Percentage
Bosniaks	108	97.3%
Serbs	3	2.7%
Total	111	100%
