= Čeljadinići =

- Village
- Location within Bosnia and Herzegovina
- Coordinates: 43°44′41″N 18°48′25″E
- Country: Bosnia and Herzegovina
- Entity: Federation of Bosnia and Herzegovina
- Canton: Bosnian-Podrinje Goražde
- Municipality: Pale-Prača

Area
  - Total: 2.49 sq mi (6.46 km^{2})

Population (2013)
  - Total: 48
  - Density: 19/sq mi (7.4/km^{2})
- Time zone: UTC+1 (CET)
  - Summer (DST): UTC+2 (CEST)

Čeljadinići is a village in the municipality of Pale-Prača, Bosnia and Herzegovina. According to the 2013 census, the village has a population of 48.

== Demographics ==
According to the 2013 census, its population was 48, all Bosniaks.
