= Sumbul (name) =

Sumbul or Sumbal can be both a unisex given name and a surname. Notable people with the name include:

== Given name ==
- Sumbal Malik Hussain, Pakistani politician
- Sumbul Iqbal, Pakistani television actress
- Sumbal Khan (1926–2007), Pakistani football centre-half
- Sumbul Shahid (1954–2021), Pakistani actress
- Sumbul Siddiqui, Pakistani-American mayor
- Sumbul Touqeer, Indian actress

== Surname ==
- Arshina Sumbul, Indian model
- Avdo Sumbul (1884–1915), Austro-Hungarian journal editor and activist
