= Komrani =

- Village
- Location within Bosnia and Herzegovina
- Coordinates: 43°44′N 18°47′E
- Country: Bosnia and Herzegovina
- Entity: Federation of Bosnia and Herzegovina
- Canton: Bosnian-Podrinje Goražde
- Municipality: Pale-Prača

Area
  - Total: 2.55 sq mi (6.61 km^{2})

Population (2013)
  - Total: 20
  - Density: 7.8/sq mi (3.0/km^{2})
- Time zone: UTC+1 (CET)
  - Summer (DST): UTC+2 (CEST)

Komrani is a village in the municipality of Pale-Prača, Bosnia and Herzegovina. According to the 2013 census, the village has a population of 20.

== Demographics ==
=== Historical evolution of the population in the settlement ===
Historical population
Year	Pop.	±%
1948		—
1953		—
1961	169	—
1971	154	−8.9%
1981	135	−12.3%
1991	109	−19.3%
2013	20	−81.7%

=== Distribution of the population by nationalities (1991) ===
Nationality	Number	%
Muslims	99	90.83
Serbs	10	9.17
