= Brnjica, Croatia =

Settlement in Šibenik-Knin County, Croatia

Brnjica
- Settlement
- Interactive map of Brnjica
- Location of Brnjica in Croatia
- Coordinates: 43°49′14″N 16°02′23″E
- Country: Croatia
- County: Šibenik-Knin
- City: Šibenik

Area
  - Total: 5.7 km^{2} (2.2 sq mi)

Population (2021)
  - Total: 57
  - Density: 10/km^{2} (26/sq mi)
- Time zone: UTC+1 (CET)
  - Summer (DST): UTC+2 (CEST)
- Postal code: 22323 Unešić
- Area code: +385 (0)22

Brnjica is a settlement in the City of Šibenik in Croatia. In 2021, its population was 57.

== Demographics ==
Brnjica: Population trends 1857–2021
v

population			134	104	116	128	152	157	169	192	195	184	154	115	79	72	57
	1857	1869	1880	1890	1900	1910	1921	1931	1948	1953	1961	1971	1981	1991	2001	2011	2021

Sources: Croatian Bureau of Statistics publications
