= Sumbulovac =

Sumbulovac Сумбуловац
- Village
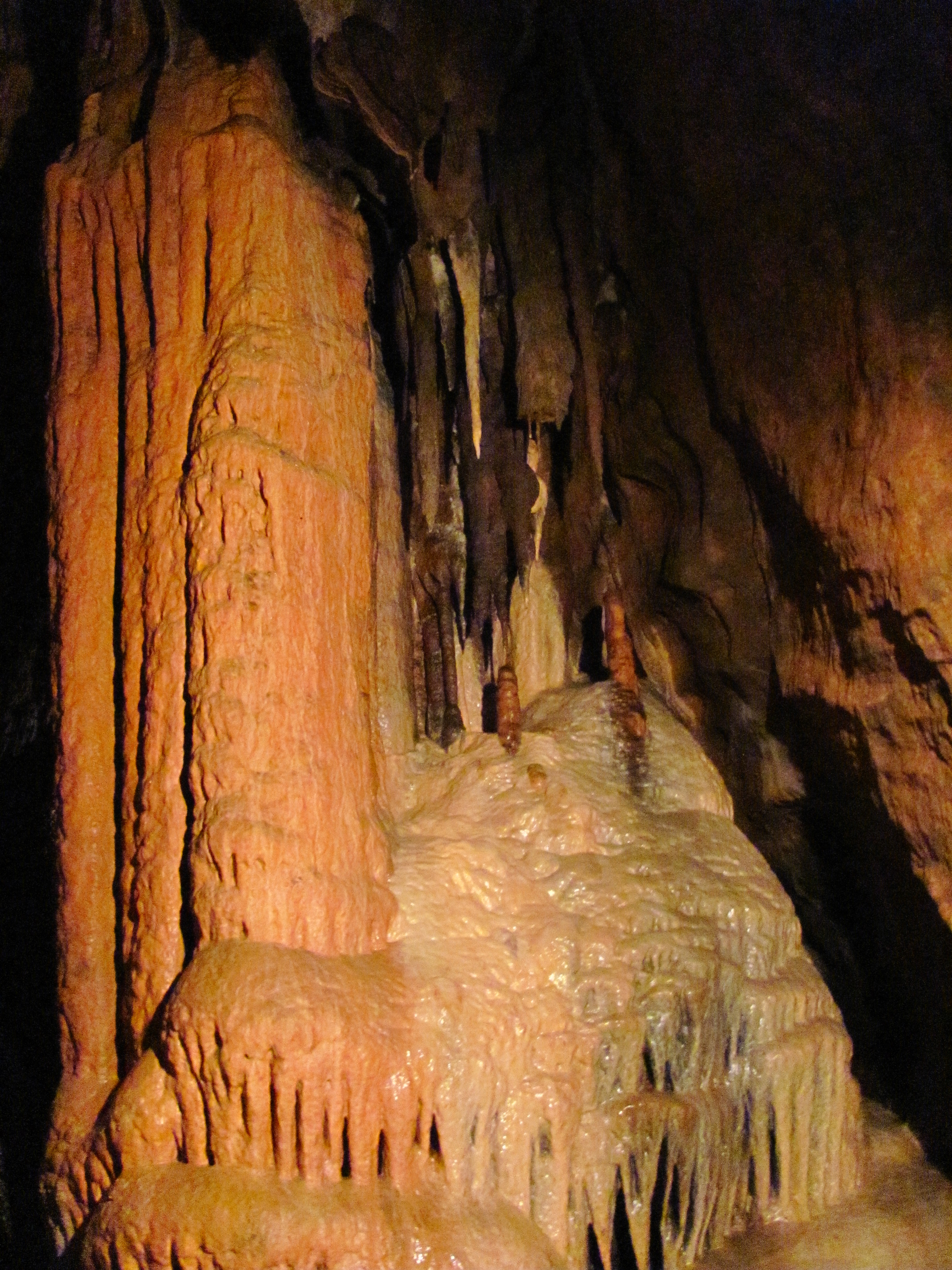
- Orlovača cave in Sumbulovac

- Location within Bosnia and Herzegovina
- Coordinates: 43°52′31″N 18°34′43″E
- Country: Bosnia and Herzegovina
- Entity: Republika Srpska
- Municipality: Pale
- Time zone: UTC+1 (CET)
  - Summer (DST): UTC+2 (CEST)

Sumbulovac (Serbian Cyrillic: Сумбуловац) is a village in the municipality of Pale, Bosnia and Herzegovina.
