= Gornja Vinča =

Gornja Vinča Горња Винча
- Village
- Location within Bosnia and Herzegovina
- Coordinates: 43°46′57″N 18°47′58″E
- Country: Bosnia and Herzegovina
- Entity: Republika Srpska
- Municipality: Pale
- Time zone: UTC+1 (CET)
  - Summer (DST): UTC+2 (CEST)

Gornja Vinča (Serbian Cyrillic: Горња Винча) is a village in the municipality of Pale, Bosnia and Herzegovina.
