= Čemernica (Pale) =

- Village
- Location within Bosnia and Herzegovina
- Coordinates: 43°43′51″N 18°52′04″E
- Country: Bosnia and Herzegovina
- Entity: Federation of Bosnia and Herzegovina
- Canton: Bosnian-Podrinje Goražde
- Municipality: Pale-Prača

Area
  - Total: 1.58 sq mi (4.08 km^{2})

Population (2013)
  - Total: 37
  - Density: 23/sq mi (9.1/km^{2})
- Time zone: UTC+1 (CET)
  - Summer (DST): UTC+2 (CEST)
- Website: https://cemernica.com

Čemernica is a village in the municipality of Pale-Prača, Bosnia and Herzegovina.

== Demographics ==
According to the 2013 census, its population was 37, all Bosniaks.
