= Brnjica (Golubac) =

Brnjica Брњица
- Village
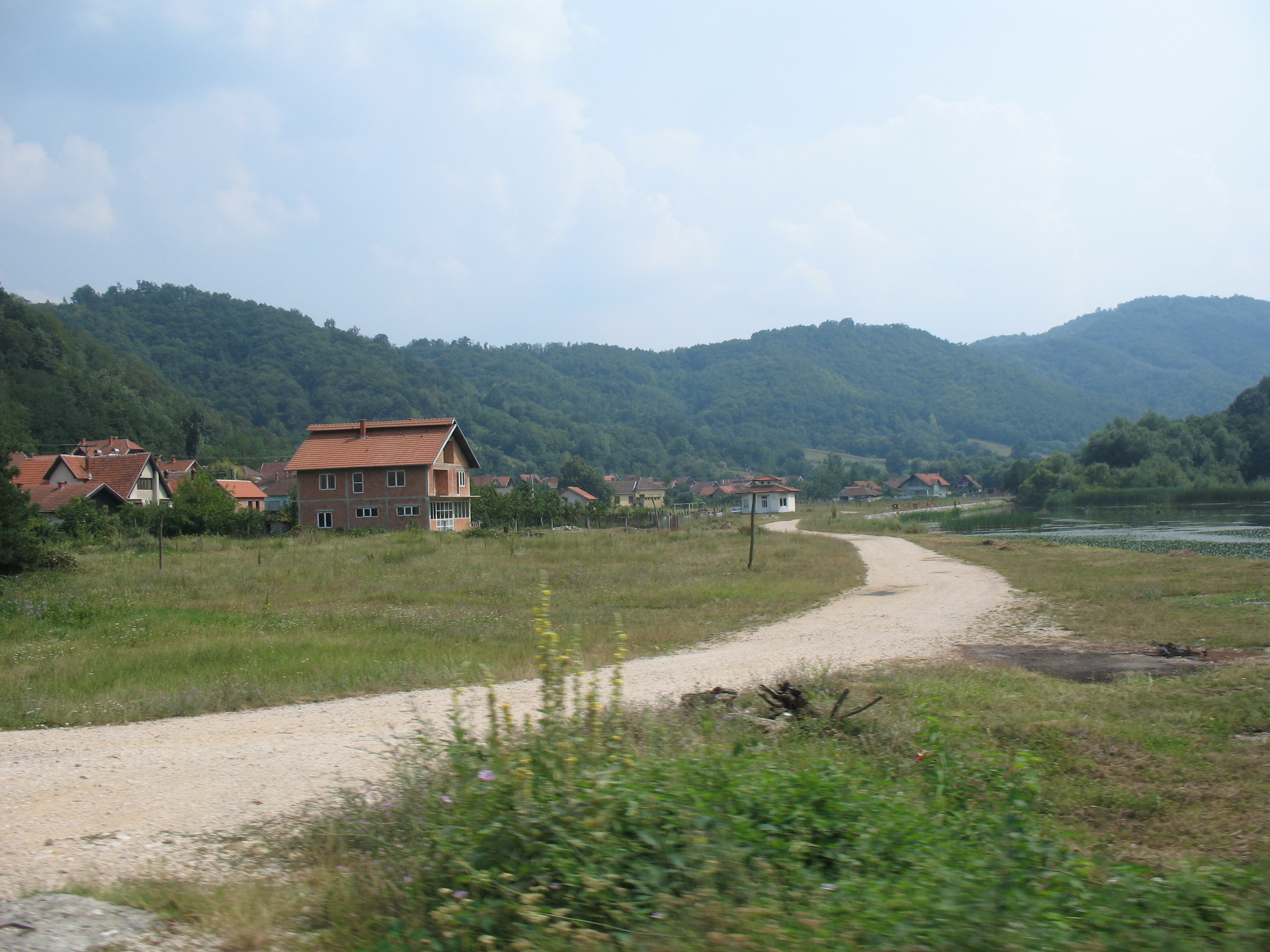

- Location within Serbia
- Coordinates: 44°39′11″N 21°46′07″E
- Country: Serbia
- District: Braničevo District
- Municipality: Golubac

Population (2002)
  - Total: 391
- Time zone: UTC+1 (CET)
  - Summer (DST): UTC+2 (CEST)

Brnjica is a village in the municipality of Golubac, Serbia. According to the 2002 census, the village has a population of 391 people.
