= Bulozi, Istočni Stari Grad =

Bulozi Булози
- Village
- Location within Bosnia and Herzegovina
- Coordinates: 43°50′51″N 18°30′20″E
- Country: Bosnia and Herzegovina
- Entity: Republika Srpska
- Municipality: Istočni Stari Grad
- Time zone: UTC+1 (CET)
  - Summer (DST): UTC+2 (CEST)

Bulozi (Serbian Cyrillic: Булози) is a village in the municipality of Istočni Stari Grad, Republika Srpska, Bosnia and Herzegovina.
