= Pale, Bosnian-Podrinje Canton Goražde =

Pale Пале-Прача
- Municipality
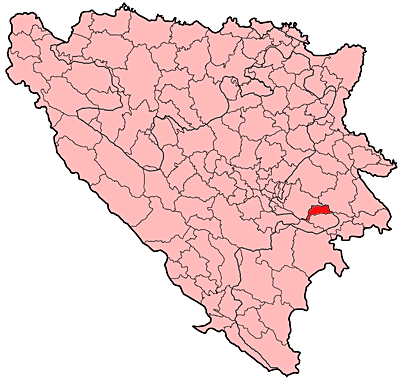
- Location of Pale-Prača within Bosnia and Herzegovina.
- Coordinates: 43°45′50″N 18°45′50″E
- Country: Bosnia and Herzegovina
- Entity: Federation of Bosnia and Herzegovina
- Canton: Bosnian-Podrinje Canton
- Geographical region: Podrinje

Government
  - Municipal mayor: Almin Ćutuk (SDA)

Area
  - Total: 86.4 km^{2} (33.4 sq mi)

Population (2013)
  - Total: 904
  - Density: 12/km^{2} (31/sq mi)
- Time zone: UTC+1 (CET)
  - Summer (DST): UTC+2 (CEST)
- Area code: +387 38
- Website: www.praca.com.ba

Pale (Serbian Cyrillic: Пале) is a municipality located in Bosnian-Podrinje Canton Goražde of the Federation of Bosnia and Herzegovina, an entity of Bosnia and Herzegovina. The center of the municipality is Prača. According to the 2013 census, the municipality has 904 inhabitants.

== Demographics ==
=== Settlements ===
The municipality consists of 15 settlements with their respective populations:

- Brdarići - 20
- Brojnići - 27
- Bulozi - 6
- Čeljadinići - 48
- Čemernica - 37
- Datelji - 112
- Donja Vinča - uninhabited
- Kamenica - uninhabited
- Komrani - 20
- Prača - 304
- Hrenovica - 39
- Srednje - uninhabited
- Šainovići - 111
- Turkovići - 169
- Vražalice - 11

=== 2013 census ===
Municipality	Nationality								Total
Municipality	Bosniaks	%	Croats	%	Serbs	%	Undeclared and other	%	Total
Pale-Prača	859	95.02	1	0.11	33	3.65	11	1.21	904

== Features ==
The geographical location, fertile soil, great climate, and rich forests led many people to inhabit the municipality in early times. Today many remains from the medieval times can be found in the municipality of Pale-Prača.

== See also ==
- Bosnian-Podrinje Canton Goražde
- Pale
