= List of twin towns and sister cities in Turkey =

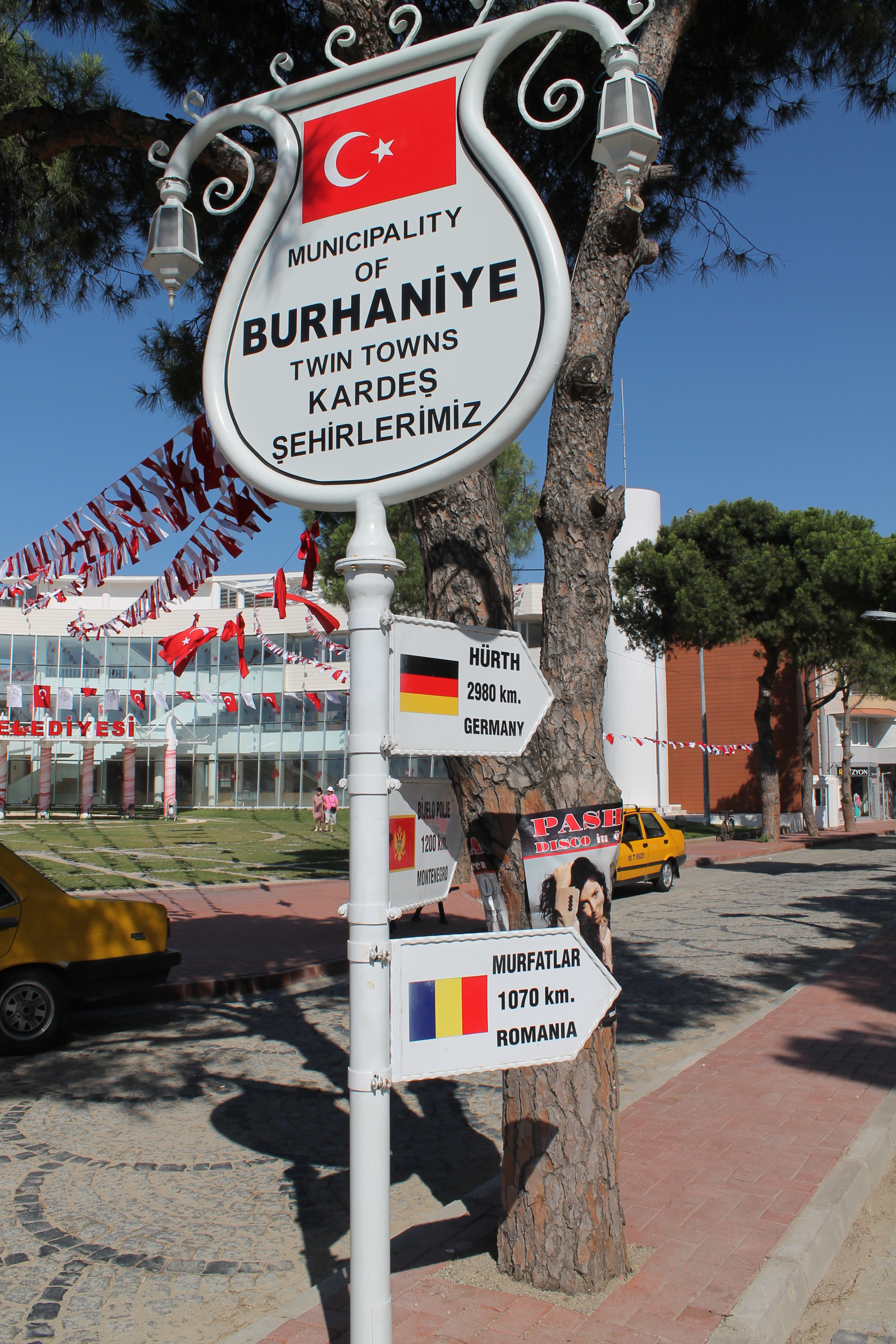
Twin towns of Burhaniye

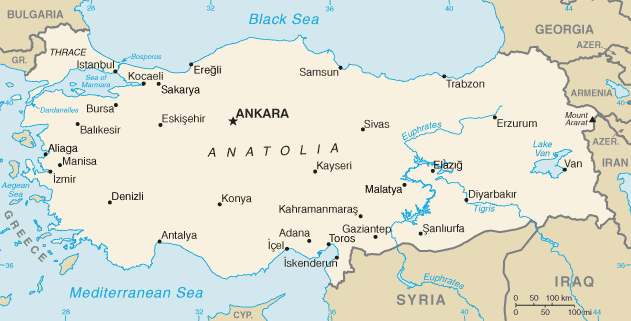
Map of Turkey

This is a list of places in Turkey which have standing links to local communities in other countries known as "town twinning" (usually in Europe) or "sister cities" (usually in the rest of the world).

== A ==
Adapazarı

- Klina, Kosovo
- Louisville, United States

Afyonkarahisar

- Cheboksary, Russia
- Hamm, Germany
- Latakia, Syria
- Peja, Kosovo
- Turkistan, Kazakhstan
- Yunfu, China

Akhisar

- Donji Vakuf, Bosnia and Herzegovina
- Gostivar, North Macedonia
- Lausanne, Switzerland
- Lima, Peru

Alanya

- Dergachyovsky District, Russia
- Fushun, China
- Geoagiu, Romania
- Gladbeck, Germany
- Goa, India
- Keszthely, Hungary
- Mahdia, Tunisia
- Nea Ionia, Greece
- Murmansk, Russia
- Oer-Erkenschwick, Germany
- Rovaniemi, Finland
- Šilutė, Lithuania
- South-Eastern AO (Moscow), Russia
- Špindlerův Mlýn, Czech Republic
- Talsi, Latvia
- Trakai, Lithuania
- Wodzisław Śląski, Poland
- Zelenogorsk, Russia

Aliağa

- Radoviš, North Macedonia

Altınova

- Akanthou, Cyprus
- Bužim, Bosnia and Herzegovina
- Centar Župa, North Macedonia
- Dve Mogili, Bulgaria
- Konjic, Bosnia and Herzegovina
- Studeničani, North Macedonia

Amasya

- Berat, Albania
- Brindisi, Italy
- Osh, Kyrgyzstan
- Prizren, Kosovo
- Tulcea, Romania

Anamur

- Bingen am Rhein, Germany

Ankara

- Addis Ababa, Ethiopia
- Amman, Jordan
- Ashgabat, Turkmenistan
- Astana, Kazakhstan
- Bangkok, Thailand
- Beijing, China
- Bishkek, Kyrgyzstan
- Bissau, Guinea-Bissau
- Bucharest, Romania
- Budapest, Hungary
- Chișinău, Moldova
- Damascus, Syria
- Doha, Qatar
- Dushanbe, Tajikistan
- Hanoi, Vietnam
- Havana, Cuba
- Islamabad, Pakistan
- Kabul, Afghanistan
- Kazan, Russia
- Khartoum, Sudan
- Kinshasa, Democratic Republic of the Congo
- Kuala Lumpur, Malaysia
- Kuwait City, Kuwait
- Kyiv, Ukraine
- Ljubljana, Slovenia
- Manama, Bahrain
- Maputo, Mozambique
- Minsk, Belarus
- Mogadishu, Somalia
- Moscow, Russia
- Niamey, Niger
- Nicosia, Cyprus
- Podgorica, Montenegro
- Pristina, Kosovo
- Rizokarpaso, Cyprus
- Sanaa, Yemen
- Sarajevo, Bosnia and Herzegovina
- Seoul, South Korea
- Skopje, North Macedonia
- Sofia, Bulgaria
- Tashkent, Uzbekistan
- (Georgia (country)) Tbilisi, Georgia
- Tehran, Iran
- Tirana, Albania
- Tunis, Tunisia
- Ufa, Russia
- Ulaanbaatar, Mongolia
- Washington, D.C., United States
- Zagreb, Croatia

Antakya

- Aalen, Germany
- Kiel, Germany

Antalya

- Austin, United States
- Famagusta, Cyprus
- Haikou, China
- Jeonju, South Korea
- Kazan, Russia
- Kunming, China
- Liwan (Guangzhou), China
- Miami, United States
- Mostar, Bosnia and Herzegovina
- Nuremberg, Germany
- Omsk, Russia
- Qingdao, China
- Rostov-on-Don, Russia
- Seville, Spain
- Suncheon, South Korea
- Taldykorgan, Kazakhstan
- Ürümqi, China
- Vladimir, Russia
- Xining, China
- Yalta, Ukraine

Ardahan

- (Georgia (country)) Akhaltsikhe, Georgia
- Grozny, Russia

Ataşehir

- Monheim am Rhein, Germany
- Sandanski, Bulgaria

Avcılar

- Razgrad, Bulgaria

== B ==
Bağcılar

- Almaly (Almaty), Kazakhstan
- Berat, Albania
- Bužim, Bosnia and Herzegovina
- Čelić, Bosnia and Herzegovina
- Çorovodë (Skrapar), Albania
- Deir al-Balah, Palestine
- Galateia, Cyprus
- Gerolakkos, Cyprus
- Kong, Ivory Coast
- Morphou, Cyprus
- Muzaffargarh, Pakistan
- Paynesville, Liberia
- Peja, Kosovo

Bahçelievler

- Újbuda (Budapest), Hungary

Balıkesir

- Prizren, Kosovo
- Roxas, Philippines
- Schwäbisch Hall, Germany
- South Chungcheong, South Korea
- Štip, North Macedonia

Bandırma

- Cary, United States
- Kamen, Germany
- Novi Pazar, Bulgaria
- Tongxiang, China

Bartın

- Lünen, Germany

Bergama

- Alkmaar, Netherlands
- Asenovgrad, Bulgaria
- Baalbek, Lebanon
- Böblingen, Germany
- Lefka, Cyprus
- Nea Peramos, Greece
- Orhei, Moldova
- Pergamos, Cyprus
- Piatra Neamț, Romania
- Rosoman, North Macedonia
- Sanski Most, Bosnia and Herzegovina
- Shaki, Azerbaijan

Beşiktaş

- Brăila, Romania
- Brooklyn (New York), United States
- Budapest II (Budapest), Hungary
- Erlangen, Germany
- Herne, Germany
- Morphou, Cyprus
- Tuzla, Bosnia and Herzegovina
- Xanthi, Greece

Beykoz

- Mohács, Hungary
- Mülheim an der Ruhr, Germany
- Prizren, Kosovo
- Trikomo, Cyprus

Beyoğlu

- Bunkyō (Tokyo), Japan
- Centar (Skopje), North Macedonia
- Chornomorsk, Ukraine
- Dubrovnik, Croatia
- Genoa, Italy
- Mitte (Berlin), Germany
- Novi Grad (Sarajevo), Bosnia and Herzegovina
- Pécs, Hungary
- Schaerbeek, Belgium
- Sector 1 (Bucharest), Romania
- Seongbuk (Seoul), South Korea
- Sidi Bernoussi (Casablanca), Morocco
- Tozeur, Tunisia
- Vitacura, Chile

Bolu

- Donghae, South Korea
- Kharkhorin, Mongolia
- Kyzylorda, Kazakhstan
- Qazax, Azerbaijan
- Uzgen, Kyrgyzstan

Bozüyük

- Zavidovići, Bosnia and Herzegovina

Burhaniye

- Bijelo Polje, Montenegro
- Hürth, Germany
- Murfatlar, Romania

Bursa

- Anshan, China
- Bakhchysarai, Ukraine
- Bitola, North Macedonia
- Ceadîr-Lunga, Moldova
- Darmstadt, Germany
- Galkayo, Somalia
- Hebron, Palestine
- Kairouan, Tunisia
- Košice, Slovakia
- Kulmbach, Germany
- Kyzylorda, Kazakhstan
- Mascara, Algeria
- Mogilev, Belarus
- Momchilgrad, Bulgaria
- Nicosia, Cyprus
- Novi Pazar, Serbia
- Oulu, Finland
- Pleven, Bulgaria
- Plovdiv, Bulgaria
- Pristina, Kosovo
- Sarajevo, Bosnia and Herzegovina
- Tirana, Albania
- Veliko Tarnovo, Bulgaria
- Vinnytsia, Ukraine

Büyükçekmece

- Cheonan, South Korea
- Gelsenkirchen, Germany
- Gorna Oryahovitsa, Bulgaria
- Kranj, Slovenia
- Lapithos, Cyprus
- Mamusha, Kosovo

== C ==
Çanakkale

- Kerch, Ukraine
- Pardubice, Czech Republic
- Pomezia, Italy
- Osnabrück, Germany
- Wellington, New Zealand

Çankaya

- Bangui, Central African Republic
- Centar (Skopje), North Macedonia
- Kyrenia, Cyprus
- Maykop, Russia
- Northern AO (Moscow), Russia
- Playa (Havana), Cuba
- Sector 1 (Bucharest), Romania
- Sükhbaatar (Ulaanbaatar), Mongolia
- Woollahra, Australia
- Yuexiu (Guangzhou), China

Çekmeköy

- Berrechid, Morocco
- Bilma, Niger
- Dojran, North Macedonia
- Morphou, Cyprus
- Vogošća, Bosnia and Herzegovina

Çeşme

- Agios Sergios, Cyprus
- Ancona, Italy
- Asciano, Italy
- Bakhchysarai, Ukraine
- Chios, Greece
- Dömös, Hungary
- El Mina, Lebanon
- Voula, Greece
- Wise, United States

Çınarcık

- Karavas, Cyprus
- Phalsbourg, France
- Radoviš, North Macedonia

Çorum

- Gimhae, South Korea
- Merri-bek, Australia

Çubuk

- Maglaj, Bosnia and Herzegovina
- Sabinov, Slovakia

== D ==
Denizli

- Almelo, Netherlands
- Brăila, Romania
- (Georgia (country)) Isani (Tbilisi), Georgia
- Jiaozhou, China
- Muan, South Korea
- Pavlodar, Kazakhstan

Develi

- Cazin, Bosnia and Herzegovina
- Vierzon, France

Didim

- Laubach, Germany
- Leros, Greece

Dilovası

- Szentgotthárd, Hungary

== E ==
Edremit

- Erdenet, Mongolia
- Kamp-Lintfort, Germany
- Nicolosi, Italy
- Srebrenik, Bosnia and Herzegovina

Elazığ

- Akmola Region, Kazakhstan
- Mamusha, Kosovo

Ereğli

- Gwangjin (Seoul), South Korea

Erzin

- Freiberg am Neckar, Germany

Eskişehir

- Changzhou, China
- Cluj-Napoca, Romania
- Frankfurt am Main, Germany
- Kazan, Russia
- Kyrenia, Cyprus
- Linz, Austria
- Paju, South Korea
- Saint-Josse-ten-Noode, Belgium

== F ==
Fatih

- Stari Grad (Sarajevo), Bosnia and Herzegovina
- Wiesbaden, Germany

Finike

- Budapest II (Budapest), Hungary
- Mosbach, Germany

== G ==
Gaziantep

- Aleppo, Syria
- Aryanah, Tunisia
- Celje, Slovenia
- Cetinje, Montenegro
- Duisburg, Germany
- Irbid, Jordan
- Karlstad, Sweden
- Kenitra, Morocco
- Kermanshah, Iran
- Kharkiv, Ukraine
- Kotor, Montenegro
- Kuwait City, Kuwait
- Ludwigshafen am Rhein, Germany
- Maykop, Russia
- Minsk, Belarus
- Nicosia, Cyprus
- Ostrava, Czech Republic
- Pittsburgh, United States
- Sabaragamuwa, Sri Lanka
- Tripoli, Lebanon
- Ulaanbaatar, Mongolia

Gaziosmanpaşa

- Tutin, Serbia

Gebze

- Garoowe, Somalia
- Kakanj, Bosnia and Herzegovina
- Karakol, Kyrgyzstan
- Kiseljak, Bosnia and Herzegovina
- Kythrea, Cyprus
- Oeiras, Portugal
- Pylaia, Greece
- Samuil, Bulgaria
- Studeničani, North Macedonia
- Tyulyachinsky District, Russia

Gediz

- Gaza City, Palestine

Giresun

- Alba, Italy
- Bátonyterenye, Hungary
- La Louvière, Belgium
- Ölgii, Mongolia
- Sagae, Japan
- Shaki, Azerbaijan

== H ==
Haliliye

- Mamusha, Kosovo
- Wajir, Kenya

== I ==
Iğdır

- Shamakhi, Azerbaijan
- Sharur, Azerbaijan

İnegöl

- Donji Vakuf, Bosnia and Herzegovina
- Dunaújváros, Hungary
- Mitrovica, Kosovo
- Novi Pazar, Bulgaria
- (Georgia (country)) Rustavi, Georgia
- Takhtamukaysky District, Russia

Istanbul

- Almaty, Kazakhstan
- Amman, Jordan
- Bangkok, Thailand
- Barcelona, Spain
- Beirut, Lebanon
- Benghazi, Libya
- Berlin, Germany
- Busan, South Korea
- Cairo, Egypt
- Cologne, Germany
- Constanţa, Romania
- Damascus, Syria
- Dubai, United Arab Emirates
- Durrës, Albania
- Gaza City, Palestine
- Giza, Egypt
- Guangzhou, China
- Houston, United States
- Jakarta, Indonesia
- Jeddah, Saudi Arabia
- Johor Bahru, Malaysia
- Kazan, Russia
- Khartoum, Sudan
- Lahore, Pakistan
- Mary, Turkmenistan
- Mexico City, Mexico
- N'Djamena, Chad
- Nicosia, Cyprus
- Odesa, Ukraine
- Osh, Kyrgyzstan
- Plovdiv, Bulgaria
- Rabat, Morocco
- Rio de Janeiro, Brazil
- Saint Petersburg, Russia
- Sarajevo, Bosnia and Herzegovina
- Shanghai, China
- Shimonoseki, Japan
- Skopje, North Macedonia
- Tabriz, Iran
- (Georgia (country)) Tbilisi, Georgia
- Tunis, Tunisia
- Venice, Italy

İzmir

- Baku, Azerbaijan
- Bălți, Moldova
- Bishkek, Kyrgyzstan
- Bremen, Germany
- Bukhara, Uzbekistan
- Chernivtsi, Ukraine
- Constanţa, Romania
- Esparza, Costa Rica
- Famagusta, Cyprus
- Havana, Cuba
- Mostar, Bosnia and Herzegovina
- Nicosia, Cyprus
- Odense, Denmark
- Sarajevo, Bosnia and Herzegovina
- Skopje, North Macedonia
- Sousse, Tunisia
- Tampa, United States
- Tianjin, China
- Türkmenabat, Turkmenistan
- Volgograd, Russia
- Wuhan, China
- Xiamen, China

İzmit

- Agios Sergios, Cyprus
- Buk (Busan), South Korea
- Čair (Skopje), North Macedonia
- Ceadîr-Lunga, Moldova
- Centar Župa, North Macedonia
- Ilidža, Bosnia and Herzegovina
- Karachi, Pakistan
- Kastrychnitski (Minsk), Belarus
- Kherson, Ukraine
- Momchilgrad, Bulgaria
- Nəsimi (Baku), Azerbaijan
- Pohang, South Korea
- Tiznit, Morocco
- Travnik, Bosnia and Herzegovina
- (Georgia (country)) Vake-Saburtalo (Tbilisi), Georgia
- Vogošća, Bosnia and Herzegovina

İznik

- Jingdezhen, China
- (Georgia (country)) Khulo, Georgia
- Nikaia, Greece
- Pithiviers, France
- Spandau (Berlin), Germany
- Talas, Kyrgyzstan
- Tutin, Serbia

== K ==
Kadıköy

- Friedrichshain-Kreuzberg (Berlin), Germany
- La Goulette, Tunisia

Kahramanmaraş

- Aceh, Indonesia
- Cazin, Bosnia and Herzegovina
- Houston, United States
- Jackson, United States
- Mingachevir, Azerbaijan
- Nalchik, Russia
- Salyan, Azerbaijan
- Siliana, Tunisia

Kapaklı

- Debar, North Macedonia

Karacabey

- Ferizaj, Kosovo
- Konjic, Bosnia and Herzegovina
- Mamusha, Kosovo
- Nedelino, Bulgaria
- Sopot, Bulgaria

Karaçoban

- Lima, Peru

Karadeniz Ereğli

- Brindisi, Italy
- Düren, Germany
- Hydra, Greece
- Jinhua, China
- Monfalcone, Italy
- Târgoviște, Romania

Karasu

- Hârșova, Romania

Karatay

- Balkh, Afghanistan
- Goražde, Bosnia and Herzegovina
- Kenitra, Morocco
- Novi Pazar, Serbia

Karşıyaka

- Cascais, Portugal
- Heidenheim (district), Germany
- (Georgia (country)) Kutaisi, Georgia
- Kyrenia, Cyprus
- Loudoun County, United States
- Piran, Slovenia
- Prizren, Kosovo
- Veles, North Macedonia
- Zenica, Bosnia and Herzegovina

Kartal

- Agios Amvrosios, Cyprus
- Ardino, Bulgaria
- Asparuhovo (Karnobat), Bulgaria
- Banovići, Bosnia and Herzegovina
- Buzovna (Baku), Azerbaijan
- Ilfov County, Romania
- Sitovo, Bulgaria
- Sjenica, Serbia
- Visoko, Bosnia and Herzegovina

Kaş

- Agios Epiktitos, Cyprus
- Brühl, Germany
- Cupramontana, Italy
- Kastellorizo, Greece

Kastamonu

- Bakhchysarai, Ukraine
- Karavas, Cyprus
- Naryn, Kyrgyzstan

Kayseri

- Homs, Syria
- Krefeld, Germany
- Maroua, Cameroon
- Miskolc, Hungary
- Mostar, Bosnia and Herzegovina
- Nalchik, Russia
- Pavlodar, Kazakhstan
- Saarbrücken (district), Germany
- Shusha, Azerbaijan
- Yongin, South Korea

Keçiören

- Bambey, Senegal
- Cazaclia, Moldova
- Centar Župa, North Macedonia
- Fairfax County, United States
- Gaza City, Palestine
- Goražde, Bosnia and Herzegovina
- Hebron, Palestine
- Jambyl, Kazakhstan
- Jendouba, Tunisia
- Karakol, Kyrgyzstan
- Mamusha, Kosovo
- Morphou, Cyprus
- Stirling, Scotland, United Kingdom
- Sumgait, Azerbaijan
- Tripoli, Lebanon
- Turkistan, Kazakhstan
- Ufa, Russia

Kepez

- Stari Grad (Sarajevo), Bosnia and Herzegovina

Konak

- Bakhchysarai, Ukraine
- Brooklyn (New York), United States
- Doboj South, Bosnia and Herzegovina
- Mitte (Hamburg), Germany

Konya

- Bostanabad, Iran
- Khoy, Iran
- Kirkuk, Iraq
- Kulob, Tajikistan
- Mogadishu, Somalia
- Nishapur, Iran
- Qom, Iran
- Tetovo, North Macedonia
- Xi'an, China
- Yangzhou, China

Kuşadası

- (Georgia (country)) Batumi, Georgia
- Bihać, Bosnia and Herzegovina
- Cherkasy, Ukraine
- Gjorče Petrov (Skopje), North Macedonia
- Marl, Germany
- El Mina, Lebanon
- Monterey, United States
- Prizren, Kosovo
- Sinaia, Romania
- Strumyani, Bulgaria
- Târgu Mureș, Romania
- Vathy, Greece

Kütahya

- Anqing, China
- Bavly, Russia
- Bikaner, India
- Chistopol, Russia
- Dinniyeh, Lebanon
- Pécs, Hungary
- Rožaje, Montenegro
- Tartus, Syria

== M ==
Malatya

- Almaty, Kazakhstan
- Baton Rouge, United States
- Bukhara, Uzbekistan
- El Kef, Tunisia
- Lefka, Cyprus
- Mecca, Saudi Arabia

Mamak

- Stari Grad (Sarajevo), Bosnia and Herzegovina

Manisa

- Gyöngyös, Hungary
- Ingolstadt, Germany
- Khartoum, Sudan
- Monastir, Tunisia
- Morphou, Cyprus
- Oral, Kazakhstan
- Osh, Kyrgyzstan
- Prijedor, Bosnia and Herzegovina
- Skopje, North Macedonia
- Yiwu, China

Meram

- Akjoujt, Mauritania
- Gaza City, Palestine
- Hadžići, Bosnia and Herzegovina
- Manouba, Tunisia
- Shaki, Azerbaijan
- Tal Afar, Iraq
- Yuexiu (Guangzhou), China

Mersin

- Durban, South Africa
- Famagusta, Cyprus
- Kherson, Ukraine
- Klaipėda, Lithuania
- Kushimoto, Japan
- Nizhnekamsk, Russia
- Oberhausen, Germany
- Ufa, Russia
- West Palm Beach, United States

Mezitli

- Tempelhof-Schöneberg (Berlin), Germany

Muratpaşa

- Guilin, China
- Kyrenia, Cyprus

== N ==
Nevşehir

- Neuss, Germany
- Pforzheim, Germany

Nilüfer

- Ardino, Bulgaria
- Asenovgrad, Bulgaria
- Brăila, Romania
- Cerro (Havana), Cuba
- Châlette-sur-Loing, France
- Famagusta, Cyprus
- Gotse Delchev, Bulgaria
- Hanau, Germany
- Ķekava, Latvia
- Lublin, Poland
- Mykolaiv, Ukraine
- Nizami (Baku), Azerbaijan
- Peja, Kosovo
- Tōkai, Japan
- Zavidovići, Bosnia and Herzegovina

== O ==
Odunpazarı

- Razgrad, Bulgaria

Orhangazi

- Acharnes, Greece
- Famagusta, Cyprus
- Malabar, United States
- Malisheva, Kosovo
- Mingachevir, Azerbaijan
- Ruen, Bulgaria
- Valandovo, North Macedonia
- Vinica, North Macedonia

Osmangazi

- Agios Sergios, Cyprus
- Aleppo, Syria
- Arriana, Greece
- Beit Hanoun, Palestine
- Čair (Skopje), North Macedonia
- Galateia, Cyprus
- Gaza City, Palestine
- Kapchagay, Kazakhstan
- Kardzhali, Bulgaria
- Lahn-Dill (district), Germany
- Mamusha, Kosovo
- Obiliq, Kosovo
- Omurtag, Bulgaria
- Preševo, Serbia
- Stari Grad (Sarajevo), Bosnia and Herzegovina
- Topeiros, Greece
- Turakurgan, Uzbekistan

== P ==
Pendik

- Banda Aceh, Indonesia
- Chingeltei (Ulaanbaatar), Mongolia
- Cholpon-Ata, Kyrgyzstan
- Ciampino, Italy
- Comrat, Moldova
- Jenin, Palestine
- Kispest (Budapest), Hungary
- Madan, Bulgaria
- Mamusha, Kosovo
- Nərimanov (Baku), Azerbaijan
- Novi Pazar, Serbia
- Plasnica, North Macedonia
- Rizokarpaso, Cyprus
- Sidi Bernoussi (Casablanca), Morocco
- Sigli, Indonesia
- Smolyan, Bulgaria
- Stari Grad (Mostar), Bosnia and Herzegovina
- Târgu Jiu, Romania
- Travnik, Bosnia and Herzegovina
- Trikomo, Cyprus
- Yasamal (Baku), Azerbaijan

Princes' Islands

- Cholpon-Ata, Kyrgyzstan
- Nacka, Sweden
- Palaio Faliro, Greece
- Pokhara, Nepal
- Santa Ana, Costa Rica
- Veles, North Macedonia

== S ==
Şahinbey

- Goražde, Bosnia and Herzegovina
- Manbij, Syria
- Mirriah, Niger

Sakarya

- Osh, Kyrgyzstan
- Tataouine, Tunisia
- Zanzibar City, Tanzania

Samsun

- Bishkek, Kyrgyzstan
- Brčko, Bosnia and Herzegovina
- Dar es Salaam, Tanzania
- Donetsk, Ukraine
- Gorgan, Iran
- Kiel, Germany
- Novorossiysk, Russia
- Trikomo, Cyprus

Sancaktepe

- Balykchy, Kyrgyzstan
- Bogodogo (Ouagadougou), Burkina Faso
- Djibouti City, Djibouti
- Gornji Vakuf-Uskoplje, Bosnia and Herzegovina
- Kenitra, Morocco
- Nalaikh (Ulaanbaatar), Mongolia
- Rafah, Palestine

Sapanca

- Cazaclia, Moldova
- Dragash, Kosovo

Sarıyer

- Aachen, Germany
- Enfield, England, United Kingdom
- Jiading (Shanghai), China
- Khachmaz, Azerbaijan
- Kioneli, Cyprus
- Pergamos, Cyprus
- Vác, Hungary

Selçuk

- Dion, Greece
- (Georgia (country)) Kobuleti, Georgia
- Lienz, Austria
- Ourém, Portugal
- Radoviš, North Macedonia
- Siegburg, Germany

Selçuklu

- Arafat, Mauritania
- Bârlad, Romania
- Beit Hanoun, Palestine
- Chernoochene, Bulgaria
- Congaz, Moldova
- Gafsa, Tunisia
- Hama, Syria
- Kyrenia, Cyprus
- Penonomé, Panama
- Stari Grad (Sarajevo), Bosnia and Herzegovina
- Tešanj, Bosnia and Herzegovina

Silifke

- Bergkamen, Germany
- Haßloch, Germany
- Kosovo Polje, Kosovo
- Lefka, Cyprus
- Orsha, Belarus

Silivri

- Aytos, Bulgaria
- Câmpina, Romania
- Constanța, Romania
- Kardzhali, Bulgaria
- Nyasvizh, Belarus
- Stari Grad (Sarajevo), Bosnia and Herzegovina
- Velingrad, Bulgaria

Şişli

- Central AO (Moscow), Russia
- Seocho (Seoul), South Korea

== T ==
Talas

- Beit Lahia, Palestine
- Hamborn (Duisburg), Germany
- Talas, Kyrgyzstan

Tarsus

- Akanthou, Cyprus
- Aznakayevsky District, Russia
- Esik, Kazakhstan
- Jalal-Abad, Kyrgyzstan
- Langen, Germany
- Xətai (Baku), Azerbaijan

Tavşanlı

- Doboj East, Bosnia and Herzegovina

Tekirdağ

- Bayreuth, Germany
- Kardzhali, Bulgaria
- Kecskemét, Hungary
- Sárospatak, Hungary
- Sliven, Bulgaria
- Techirghiol, Romania

Tepebaşı

- Boyeros (Havana), Cuba
- Constanța, Romania
- Cumaná, Venezuela
- Treptow-Köpenick (Berlin), Germany

Trabzon

- (Georgia (country)) Batumi, Georgia
- Bishkek, Kyrgyzstan
- Dortmund, Germany
- Gabès, Tunisia
- Rasht, Iran
- Rizhao, China
- Sochi, Russia
- Szigetvár, Hungary
- Zanjan, Iran

Tuzla

- Mərdəkan, Azerbaijan
- Novi Grad (Sarajevo), Bosnia and Herzegovina
- Trenčianske Teplice, Slovakia
- Tuzla, Bosnia and Herzegovina

== U ==
Ümraniye

- Deroua, Morocco
- Fojnica, Bosnia and Herzegovina
- Jabalia, Palestine
- Stari Grad (Sarajevo), Bosnia and Herzegovina

Ürgüp

- Kireas, Greece

Uşak

- Astana, Kazakhstan
- Charleroi, Belgium
- Offenbach (district), Germany

Üsküdar

- Agsu, Azerbaijan
- Auburn (Cumberland), Australia
- Awjila, Libya
- Bakhchysarai, Ukraine
- Brooklyn (New York), United States
- Kaposvár, Hungary
- Shibuya (Tokyo), Japan
- Shkodër, Albania
- Zenica, Bosnia and Herzegovina

== Y ==
Yalova

- (Georgia (country)) Batumi, Georgia
- Bilhorod-Dnistrovskyi, Ukraine
- Budva, Montenegro
- Khasavyurt, Russia
- Komotini, Greece
- Kyrenia, Cyprus
- Lefkoniko, Cyprus
- Makhachkala, Russia
- Medgidia, Romania
- Novi Pazar, Serbia
- Ohrid, North Macedonia
- Panjin, China
- Peja, Kosovo
- Rottenburg am Neckar, Germany
- Smolyan, Bulgaria
- Suwon, South Korea
- Tonami, Japan
- Travnik, Bosnia and Herzegovina
- Trogir, Croatia

Yalvaç

- Sulejówek, Poland

Yenimahalle

- Asha, Cyprus

Yıldırım

- Absheron, Azerbaijan
- Akanthou, Cyprus
- Buffalo, United States
- Bukhara, Uzbekistan
- Dzhebel, Bulgaria
- Gaza City, Palestine
- Gjilan, Kosovo
- Komotini, Greece
- Özgön, Kyrgyzstan

== Z ==
Zeytinburnu

- Beit Hanoun, Palestine
- Ilidža, Bosnia and Herzegovina
- Jambyl, Kazakhstan
- Keita, Niger
- Morphou, Cyprus
- Nərimanov, Azerbaijan
- Qala, Azerbaijan
- Semey, Kazakhstan
- Shkodër, Albania
- Sisak, Croatia
- Srebrenica, Bosnia and Herzegovina

Zonguldak

- Brindisi, Italy
- Castrop-Rauxel, Germany
- Kherson, Ukraine
- Monfalcone, Italy
