= List of twin towns and sister cities in Northern Cyprus =

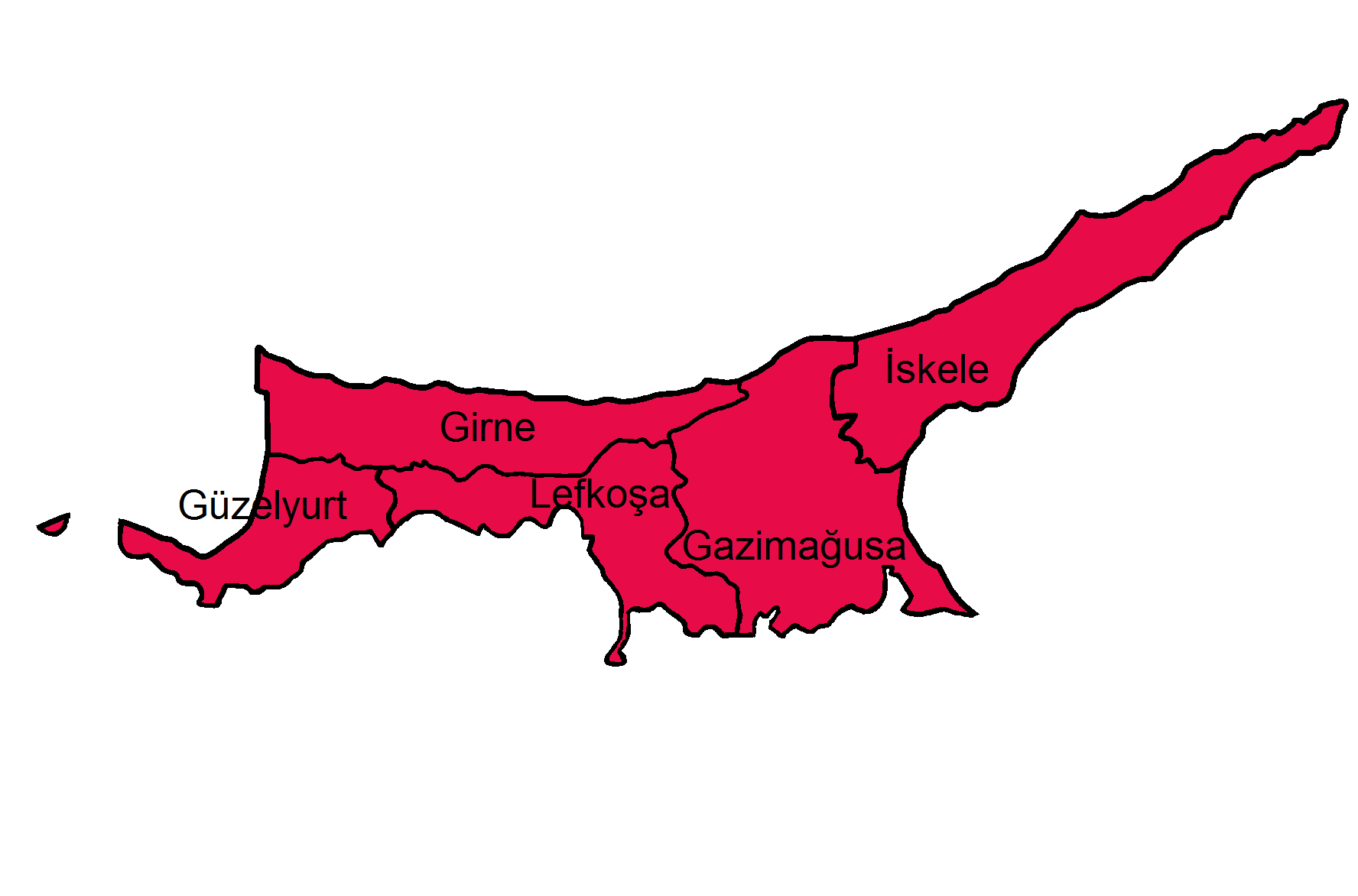
Map of Northern Cyprus

This is a list of places in Northern Cyprus which have standing links to local communities in other countries known as "town twinning" (usually in Europe) or "sister cities" (usually in the rest of the world).

== A ==
Agios Amvrosios

- Kartal, Turkey

Agios Epiktitos

- Belek, Turkey

Akanthou

- Altınova, Turkey
- Sumqayit, Azerbaijan
- Tarsus, Turkey

Ayios Seryios

- Zabrat, Azerbaijan

== F ==
Famagusta

- Antalya, Turkey
- İzmir, Turkey

== G ==
Galateia

- Bağcılar, Turkey
- Osmangazi, Turkey

Gönyeli

- Kızılcahamam, Turkey
- Sarıyer, Turkey

== K ==
Karavas

- Bornova, Turkey

Komi Kebir

- Kaymaklı, Turkey

Kyrenia

- Adana, Turkey
- Çankaya, Turkey
- Mudanya, Turkey
- Sector 4 (Bucharest), Romania

Kythrea

- Gebze, Turkey

== L ==
Lapithos

- Büyükçekmece, Turkey
- Kemer, Turkey

Lefka

- Bergama, Turkey
- Elmadağ, Turkey
- Malatya, Turkey
- Silifke, Turkey

Lefkoniko

- Yalova Turkey

== M ==
Morphou

- Beşiktaş, Turkey
- Çekmeköy, Turkey
- Keçiören, Turkey
- Kırşehir, Turkey
- Manisa, Turkey
- Zeytinburnu, Turkey

== N ==
North Nicosia

- Ankara, Turkey
- Gaziantep, Turkey
- Istanbul, Turkey

== P ==
Pergamos

- Karaman, Turkey
- Kepez, Turkey
- Sarıyer, Turkey

== R ==
Rizokarpaso

- Ankara, Turkey
- Ardeşen, Turkey
- Pendik, Turkey
- Tatvan, Turkey
- Yasamal (Baku), Azerbaijan

== T ==
Trikomo

- Mamak, Turkey
- Pendik, Turkey
- Samsun, Turkey

== V ==
Vatili

- Osmaniye, Turkey

== Y ==
Yialousa

- Sincan, Turkey
