= Blizanci, Stari Grad =

Blizanci Близанци
- Village
- Location within Bosnia and Herzegovina
- Coordinates: 43°48′58″N 18°26′44″E
- Country: Bosnia and Herzegovina
- Canton: Sarajevo Canton
- Municipality: Stari Grad
- Time zone: UTC+1 (CET)
  - Summer (DST): UTC+2 (CEST)

Blizanci (Serbian Cyrillic: Близанци) is a village in Bosnia and Herzegovina. According to the 1991 census, the village is located in the municipality of Stari Grad, Sarajevo.
