= Asparuhovo =

Asparuhovo may refer to:

- Asparuhovo, Burgas Province, a village in Bulgaria
- Asparuhovo, Montana Province, a village in Bulgaria
- Asparuhovo, Varna, a district of Varna, Bulgaria
- Asparuhovo Bridge, Varna, Bulgaria
