= Çatalköy =

Çatalköy can refer to:

- Çatalköy, Bismil
- the Turkish name for Agios Epiktitos
