= Donje Biosko =

- Village
- Location within Bosnia and Herzegovina
- Coordinates: 43°53′13″N 18°27′54″E
- Country: Bosnia and Herzegovina
- Entity: Federation of Bosnia and Herzegovina
- Canton: Sarajevo
- Municipality: Stari Grad Sarajevo

Area
  - Total: 0.85 sq mi (2.19 km^{2})

Population (2013)
  - Total: 248
  - Density: 293/sq mi (113/km^{2})
- Time zone: UTC+1 (CET)
  - Summer (DST): UTC+2 (CEST)

Donje Biosko is a village in Bosnia and Herzegovina. According to the 1991 census, the village is located in the municipality of Stari Grad, Sarajevo.

== Demographics ==
According to the 2013 census, its population was 248.

Ethnicity in 2013
Ethnicity	Number	Percentage
Bosniaks	229	92.3%
Serbs	7	2.8%
Croats	1	0.4%
other/undeclared	11	4.4%
Total	248	100%
