= Tomb of Hazrat Omar =

Tomb of a companion of Muhammad in Northern Cyprus

- Hazreti Ömer Türbesi
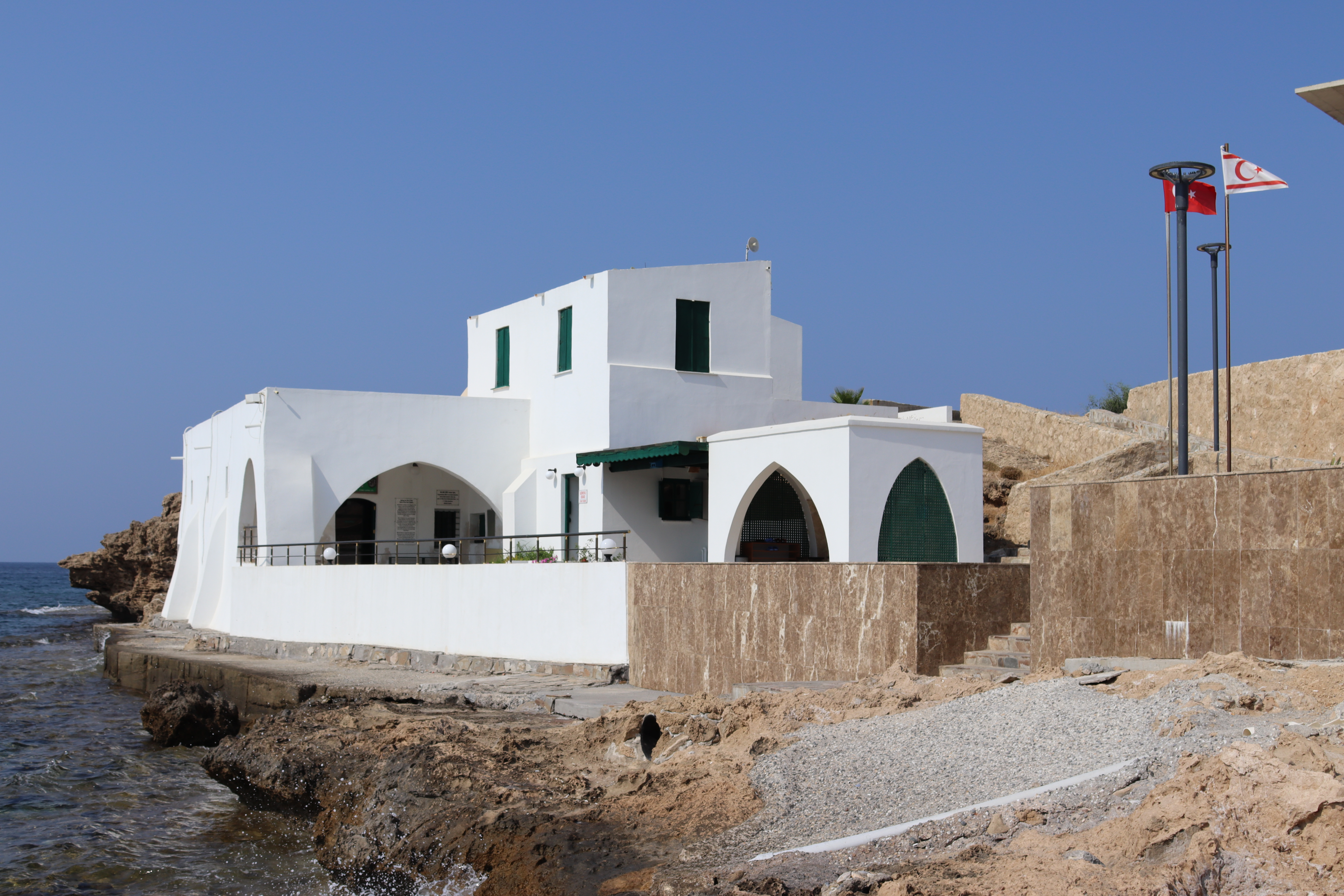
- The tomb of a companion of Muhammad.
- Interactive map of the Tomb of Hazrat Omar area

General information
- Type: Tomb, Mosque
- Location: Girne District, Çatalköy, Northern Cyprus
- Coordinates: 35.3359°N 33.3867°E
- Completed: 16th century

The tomb of Hazrat Omar (Turkish: Hazreti Ömer Türbesi) is an Ottoman tomb located in the Girne District of the largely unrecognized Turkish Republic of Northern Cyprus. The tomb is located on the rocky seaside of Çatalköy. Not only does the tomb of Omar stand there (who served as the second in command of the army of future Umayyad Caliph Mu'awiya I during the first Arab raids on Cyprus) but also of his six friends.

== Commander Omar ==
M.S. In 647, Commander Omar an influential commander in the Early Caliphate navy (and one among the many Companions of the Prophet) and his soldiers attacked the north of the Cyprus (island) from the Mediterranean Sea. In a short skirmish with the Byzantine navy following the raid near the Island, Omar and his six soldiers were killed. Their bodies were repatriated to the nearest shore and buried in a cave there. Centuries later, in 1571, when the Island of Cyprus was conquered by the Ottomans during the Ottoman–Venetian War (1570–1573), their remains were found and an Ottoman tomb was built for them almost immediately afterwards.

== Tomb ==
Today, the area where the bodies are located have been expanded to include a Mosque, and a fountain. As with all Mosques there is also an Imam, there are shrine keepers as well maintaining the sanctity of the site. There are also areas for tourists as well. The tomb, which was damaged during Cypriot intercommunal violence in 1963, was unconsciously restored after a lightning strike hit the tomb in 1974.

== Visits and pilgrimages ==
The tomb is considered sacred and used to be visited by both Turkish Cypriots and Greek Cypriots. Islamic Salah prayers are recited frequently and wishes are also made.
