= Hrid-Jarčedoli =

- Local community (mjesna zajednica)
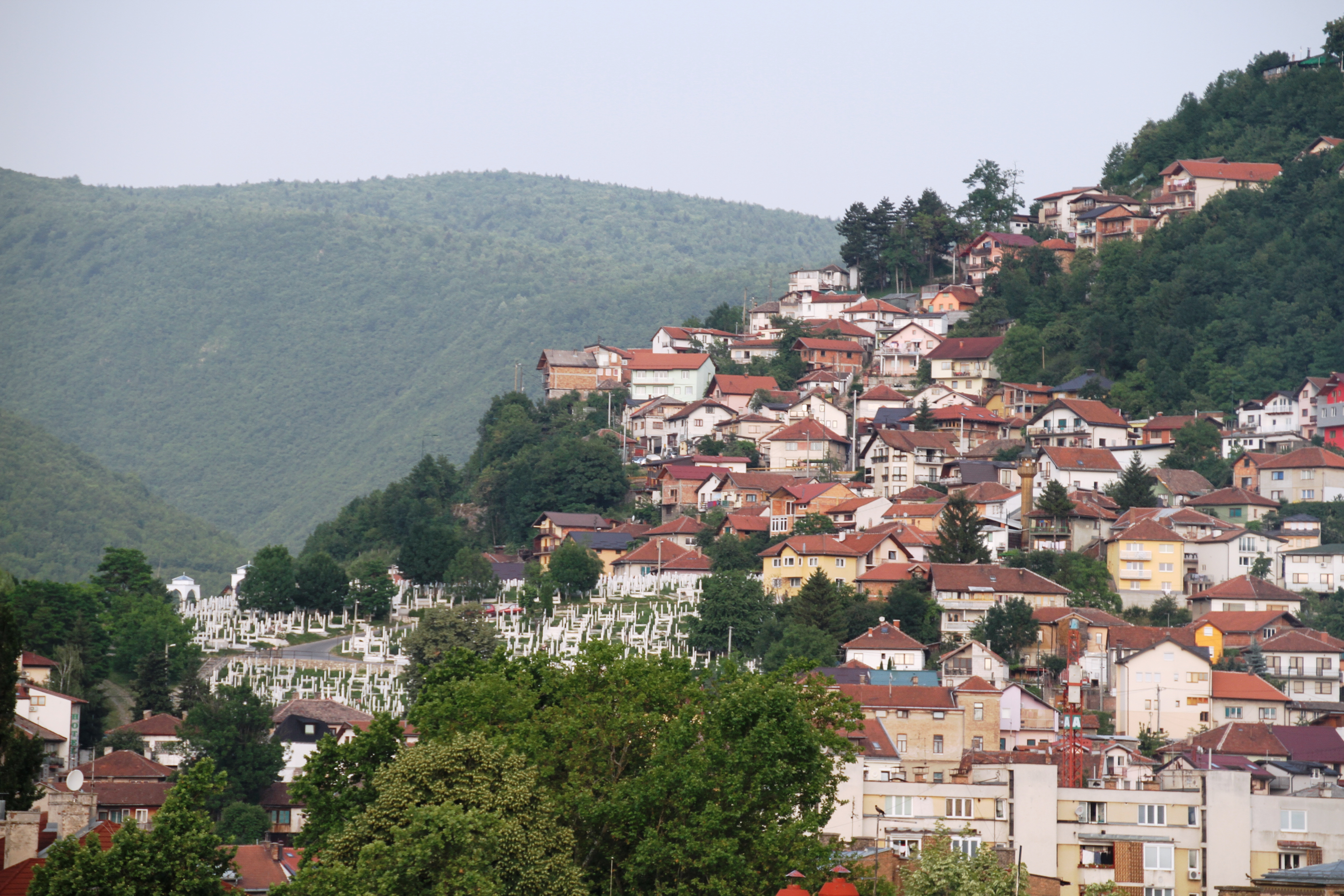
- Country: Bosnia and Herzegovina
- Entity: Federation of Bosnia and Herzegovina
- Canton: Sarajevo Canton
- Municipality: Stari Grad

Population
  - Total: 4,542
- Postal code: 71000
- Website: MZ Hrid - Jarčedoli

Hrid-Jarčedoli is a local community in the municipality of Stari Grad, Sarajevo, Bosnia and Herzegovina. It consists of two settlements, Hrid and Jarčedoli. The seat of the local community is located on Jarčedoli Street.

== Geography and position ==
Hrid-Jarčedoli is located in the southeastern part of the Stari Grad municipality. The area is characterized by hilly terrain with residential houses and significant green spaces, though Jarčedoli is significantly less densely populated than Hrid.

It borders the following areas:

- North: Babića bašća
- East and Southeast: Širokača
- Southwest: Mahmutovac
- West: Put Mladih Muslimana and the municipality of Centar.

The main road, Put Mladih Muslimana (part of the M5 highway), stretches across the western part of Hrid, connecting Sarajevo with the Romanija region and Podrinje.

== Sports and nature ==
The area is known for its natural excursion sites, including "Popov gaj" and "Trebević-Vidikovac," which offer recreational opportunities.

== Transport ==
The area is connected to the city center via public transport lines managed by the Sarajevo Ministry of Transport:

- Bus line 54: Latinska ćuprija – Hošin brijeg
- Bus line 56: Latinska ćuprija – Popov gaj

== Notable landmarks ==
Key landmarks in the Hrid and Jarčedoli area include:

- Sagr Hadži Alija's Mosque
- The Nalina and Nišan cemeteries
- "Šeih Muhamed Ef. Hadžijamaković" Primary School
- Excursion sites Popov Gaj and Trebević-Vidikovac
