= Irfan Čengić =

Bosnian politician (born 1992)

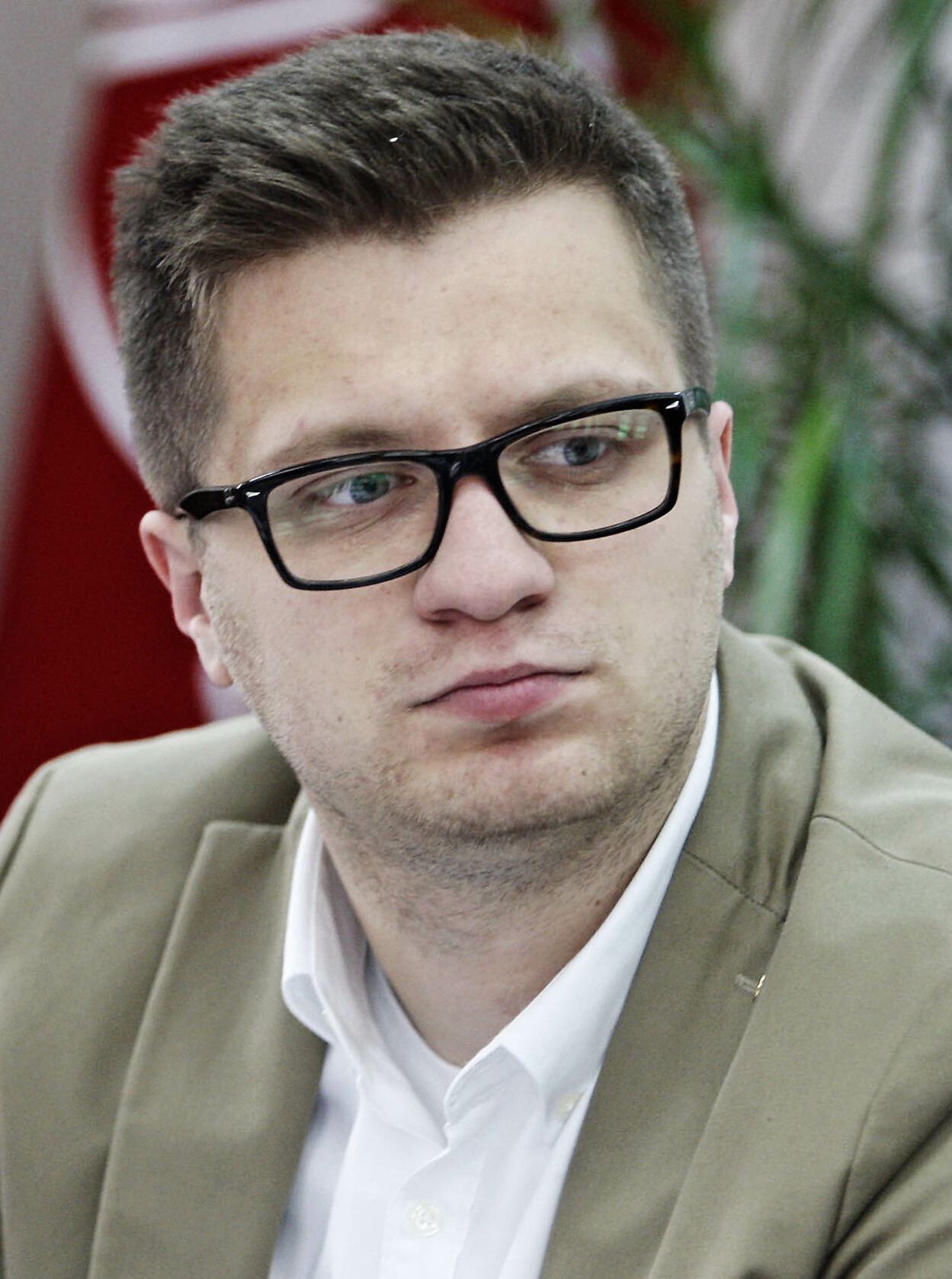
- Čengić in 2017

Municipal Mayor of Stari Grad Sarajevo
- Incumbent
- Assumed office 17 November 2023
- Preceded by: Mirsada Smajić (acting)
Parliamentary offices
Member of the Federal House of Peoples
In office
17 January 2023 – 17 November 2023
Member of the Federal House of Representatives
In office
27 November 2018 – 1 December 2022

Personal details
- Born: 21 May 1992 (age 33) Sarajevo, Bosnia and Herzegovina
- Party: Social Democratic Party (2010–present)
- Spouse: Adna Čengić
- Children: 1
- Education: University of Sarajevo (attended); University of Bihać

Irfan Čengić (born 21 May 1992) is a Bosnian politician serving as municipal mayor of Stari Grad Sarajevo since November 2023. He previously served as member of the Federal House of Peoples from January to November 2023, and also served in the Federal House of Representatives from 2018 to 2022. He is a member of the Social Democratic Party.

Čengić was born in Sarajevo in 1992. He earned a law degree from the PIM University in Banja Luka, but his degree was annulled in 2025 due to irregularities. He was elected to the Federal House of Representatives in the 2018 general election. In the 2022 general election, Čengić was elected to the Sarajevo Canton Assembly and later became member of the Federal House of Peoples. He was elected municipal mayor of Stari Grad Sarajevo in a by-election in October 2023, taking office a month later in November. He was re-elected in the 2024 municipal elections.

A member of the Social Democratic Party since 2010, Čengić was its general secretary between 2014 and 2019.

== Early life and education ==
Čengić was born on 21 May 1992 in Sarajevo, at the start of the Bosnian War and the city's siege. He initially attended the Sarajevo Law School, but left after two years and completed his law degree at the private PIM University in Banja Luka. It was revealed in June 2025 that the Inspectorate of Republika Srpska annulled Čengić's degree from PIM University a month prior, citing "errors in maintaining documentation and recognizing exams taken at the University of Sarajevo." Subsequently, Čengić confirmed in October 2025 that he was studying law at the University of Bihać, stating that he had completed his third year and was "enrolled in [his] fourth." He added that studying at the University of Sarajevo would "represent a conflict of interest."

Čengić was active in the non-governmental sector and some student organizations, and is an author of several works on the topic of political and social activism.

== Career ==
A member of the Social Democratic Party (SDP BiH) since 2010, Čengić was first elected to office in the 2012 municipal elections, becoming member of Sarajevo's Stari Grad municipal council at the age of 20. He was appointed general secretary of the SDP BiH in December 2014. He was re-elected to the Stari Grad municipal council in the 2016 municipal elections.

In the 2018 general election, Čengić was elected to the Federal House of Representatives. In April 2019, he announced his departure from the office of SDP BiH general secretary. Following the failed appointment of Bogić Bogićević as mayor of Sarajevo in March 2021, Čengić resigned as member of the SDP BiH's presidency. He was elected to the Sarajevo Canton Assembly in the 2022 general election, obtaining over 10,000 votes. After the election, he was appointed member of the Federal House of Peoples in January 2023.

After Stari Grad municipal mayor Ibrahim Hadžibajrić lost a vote of no confidence in the wake of a serious corruption scandal, a by-election was called to elect a new municipal mayor for 29 October 2023. The SDP BiH announced Čengić's candidacy in August 2023. In the election, he was elected municipal mayor of Stari Grad Sarajevo, having obtained 62.96% of the vote. He was sworn in on 17 November 2023. In the 2024 municipal elections, he was re-elected as municipal mayor, obtaining 64.42% of the vote.

== Personal life ==
Irfan is married to Adna Čengić, and together they have a son, named Hamza. They live in Sarajevo.

Political offices
| Preceded by Mirsada Smajić (acting) | Municipal Mayor of Stari Grad Sarajevo; 2023–present | Incumbent |
