= Cazaclia =

Cazaclia Kazayak
- Commune
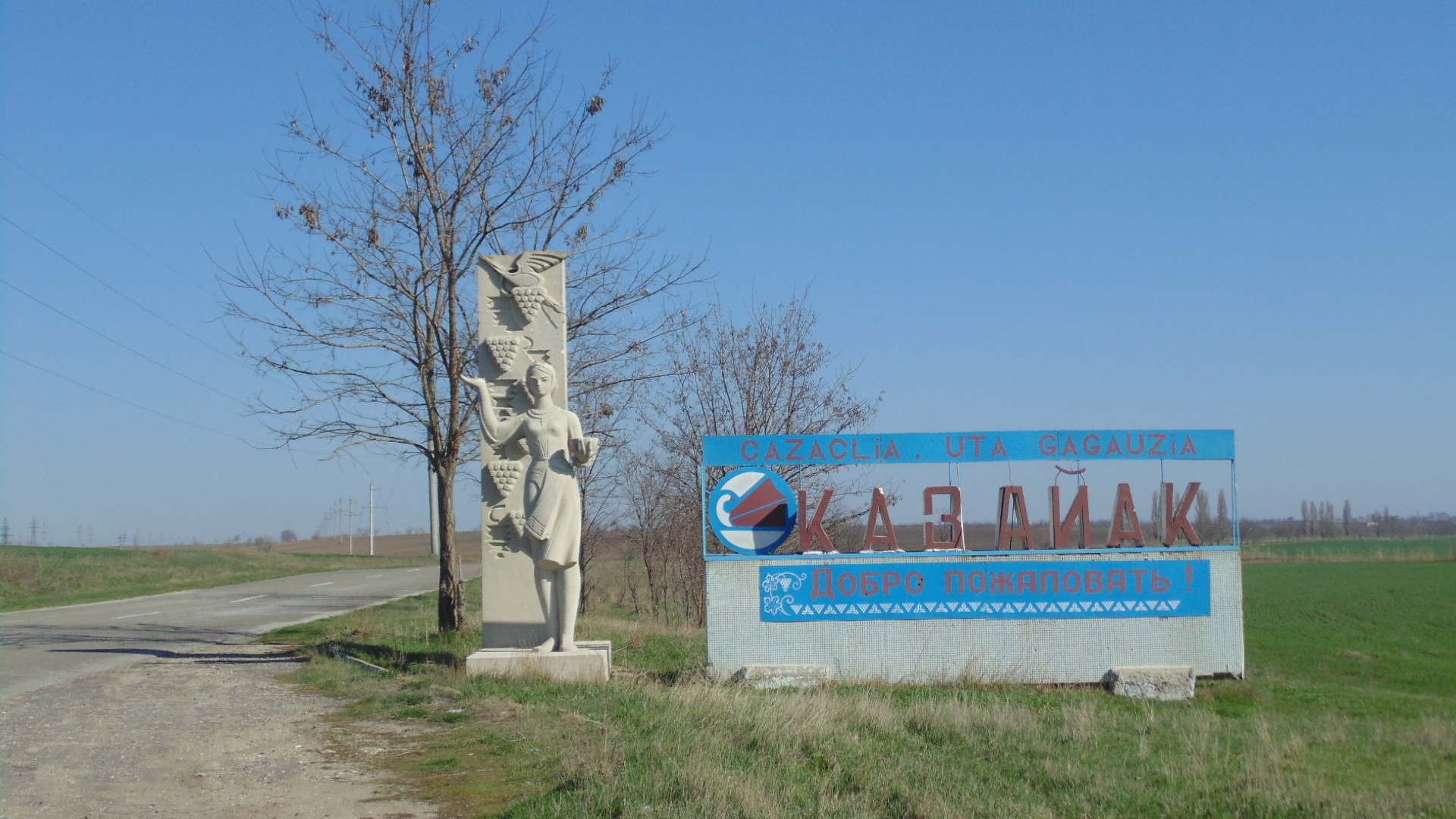
- Cazaclia welcome sign

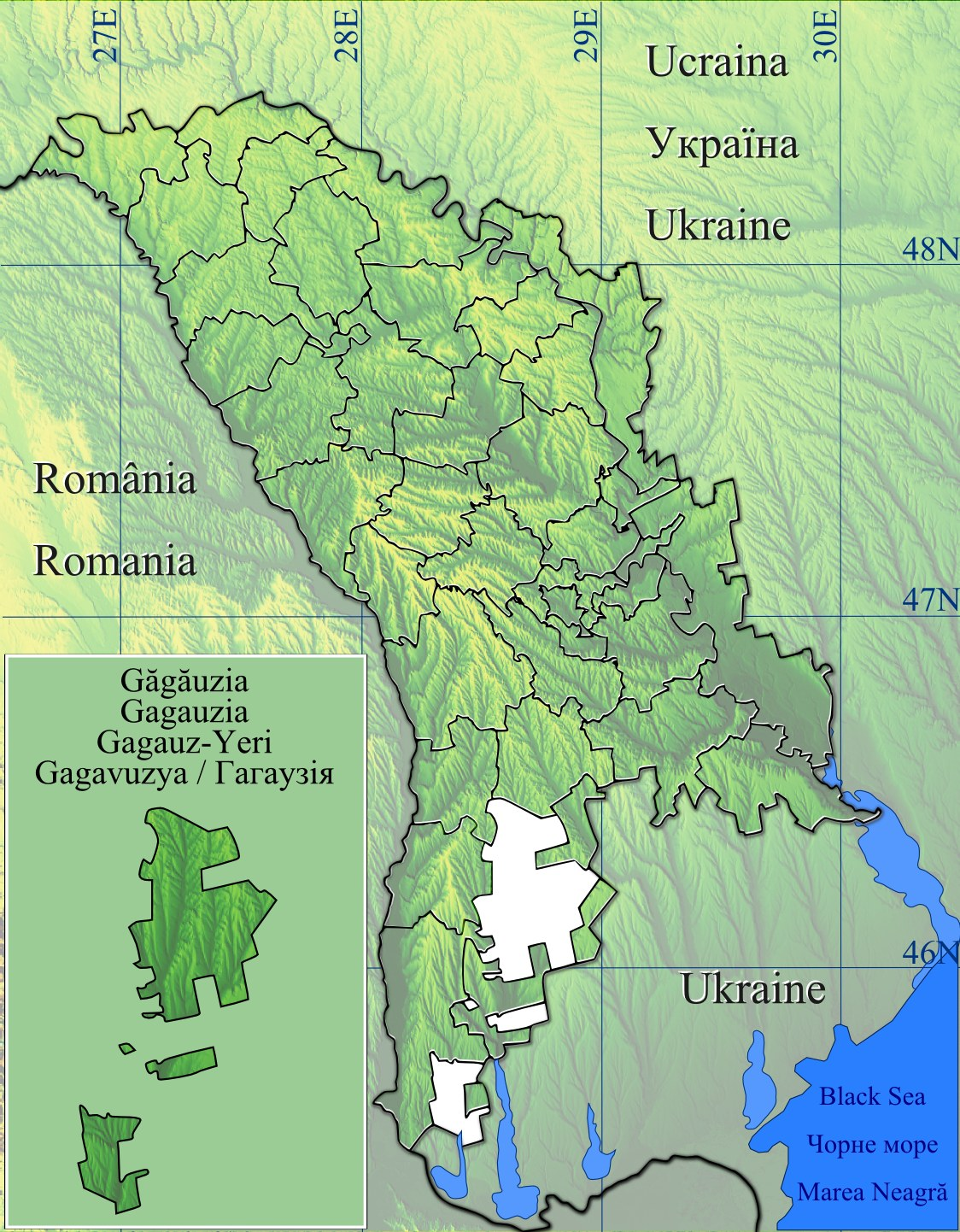
- Location of Cazaclia in Moldova
- Coordinates: 46°00′21″N 28°39′49″E
- Country: Moldova
- Autonomous Region: Gagauzia
- Founded: 1812

Government
  - Mayor: Grigoriy Kior

Population (2024)
  - Total: 4,468

Ethnicity (2024 census)
  - Gagauz people: 96.01%
  - Bulgarians: 1.52%
  - other: 2.47%
- Time zone: UTC+2 (EET)
- Climate: Cfb
- Website: cazaclia.md

Cazaclia (Gagauz: Kazayak) is a commune and village in the Ceadîr-Lunga district, Gagauz Autonomous Territorial Unit of the Republic of Moldova. According to the 2024 Moldovan census the commune has 4,468 people, 4,290 (96.01%) of them being Gagauz.

== History ==
The village was founded in 1812 in an abandoned Nogai-Tatar settlement by Gagauz refugees from Cherventsi, Dobruja.

== International relations ==
=== Twin towns — Sister cities ===
Ferapontievca is twinned with:

- Rizokarpaso, Cyprus;
- Karasu, Turkey;
- (North Macedonia) Radoviš, Northern Macedonia;
- Cherventsi, Bulgaria;
- Isparta, Turkey;
