= Akanthou =

Akanthou: Ακανθού (Greek); Tatlısu (Turkish)
- Municipality
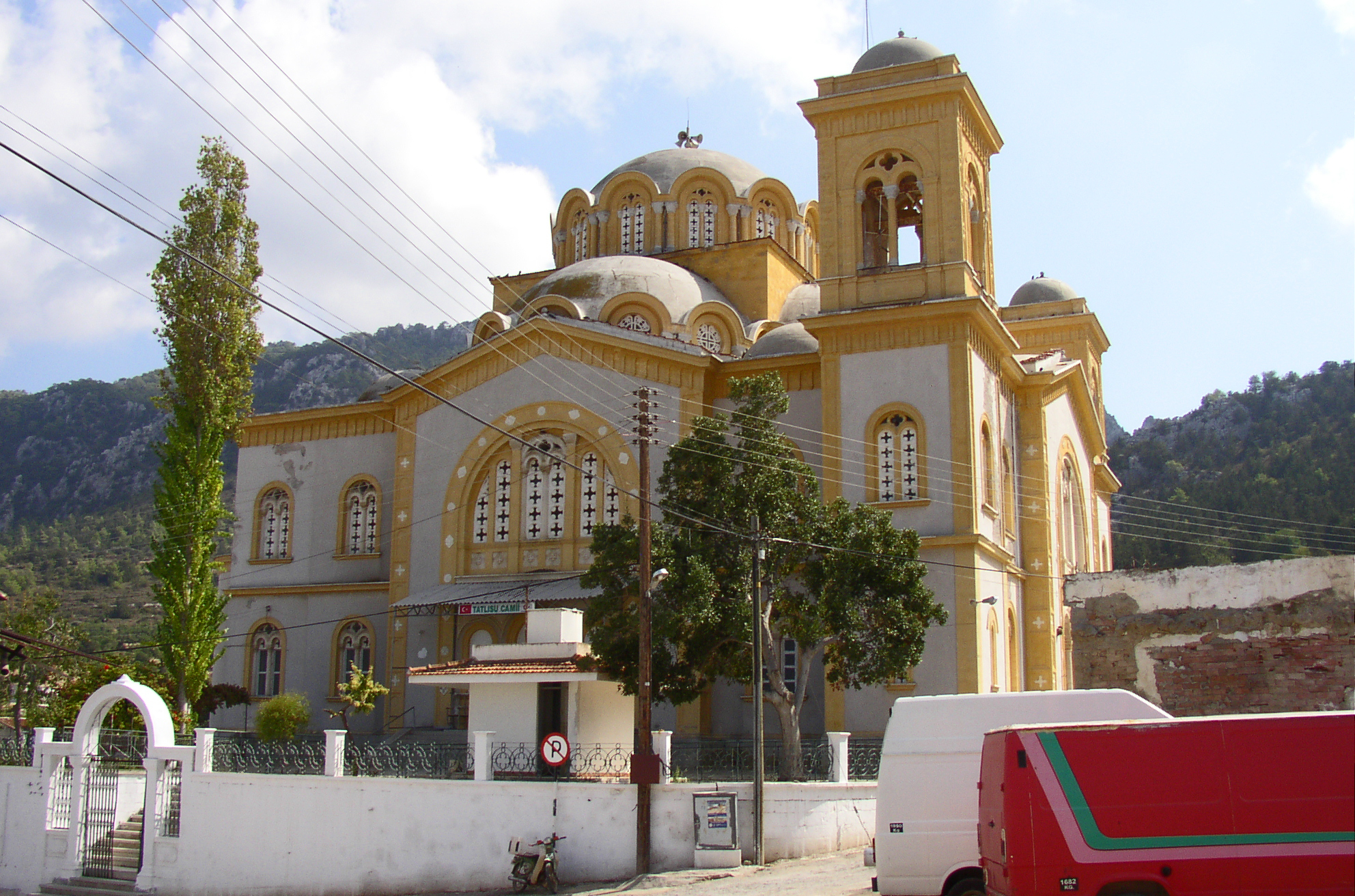
- The current mosque and former church in Akanthou

- Location within Cyprus
- Coordinates: 35°22′27″N 33°45′21″E
- Country (de jure): Cyprus
  - District: Famagusta District
- Country (de facto): Northern Cyprus
  - District: Gazimağusa District

Government
  - Mayor: A. Hayri Orçan

Population (2011)
  - Total: 1,459
- Website: Tatlısu Turkish Municipality; The municipality in NC eGov portal

Akanthou (Greek: Ακανθού, pronounced [a̠ka̠nˈθu]; Turkish: Tatlısu) is a village on the northern coast of Cyprus, under the control of Northern Cyprus. As of 2011, it had a population of 1,459.

== History ==
The first settlement that can be linked with the modern-day Akanthou was in the Kouphes area, 3.2 km (2 mi) to the northwest of Akanthou.

Akanthou was established between the 7th and the 10th century at the place where the river passing through the village meets the sea. Following the Mamluk raids in Cyprus, the coastal location was abandoned and the village moved to its present-day inland location. The name Akanthou, according to local tradition, comes from the name of a thorny bush present in the area, which is said to have provided protection for a beautiful woman, Anthousa, whom the Arab sailors tried to take captive.

Akanthou was recorded to be under the fiefdom of a nobleman called Sir John Gorap in 1385. In the 14th and 15th centuries, there are records that indicate that Akanthou hosted royal casalia of the Kingdom of Cyprus as well as sugar plantations.

Ottoman troops under Çıfıtoğlu Ahmet Pasha landed here on their way to suppress the rebellion headed by Boyacıoğlu Mehmet Agha against Ottoman rule between 1680 and 1687/1688. General Louis Palma di Cesnola wrote in 1877 that the village relied on its production of halloumi. Around two million halloumis were produced each year in the caves around the village and exported to cities abroad such as İzmir, Port Said and Alexandria.

=== Historical sites ===
- Çiftlikdüzü – A Neolithic site that could be the earliest settlement in Cyprus. Since 1998, the site has been excavated by archaeologists from the Scientific and Technological Research Council of Turkey and the Cyprus International University. It is dated to 8400 BC. The inhabitants were hunter-gatherers. Circular adobe houses and a small number of human bones, are among the artifacts found in the excavations.
- Ancient city of Pergamon – Located 5 km (3 mi) to the east of Akanthou, between the rivers Trodia and Lukkos. It was established as a colony by the inhabitants of Pergamon in Asia Minor following the Trojan War. The city survived for over a millennium. It was frequently targeted by pirate raids, and a tunnel was constructed as a way to escape to the sea. The raids were associated with mass rape of women and plunder, and the raiders would take away women and animals. The city was finally abandoned due to such raids. The inhabitants moved to Akanthou.
  - Church of Panagia Pergaminiotisa in Pergamon – Originally a large Byzantine church with three naves and three apses, but was destroyed in either an earthquake or due to Arab raids in the 7th century. The current church was built in the 11th or 12th century. Its walls were filled with ornate frescoes, but these were stolen following the Turkish invasion in 1974. They were found in Germany in possession of the thief, Aydın Dikmen, in 1997 and returned. The church was restored in 2009.

== Demographics ==
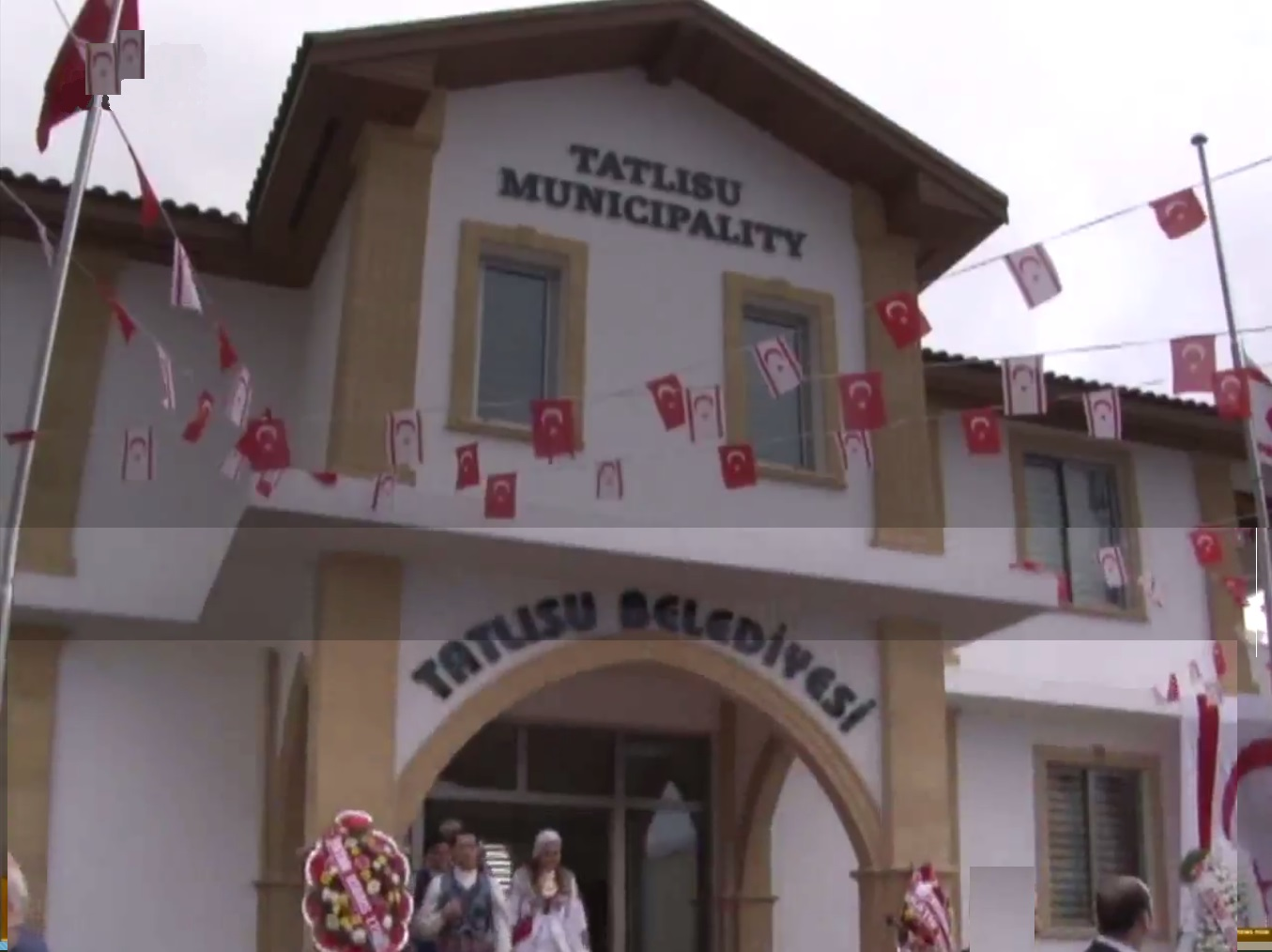
Tatlısu municipality building

Historically, the village was predominantly populated by Greek Cypriots. The 1831 census recorded the adult male population as 10 Turkish Cypriots and 163 Greek Cypriots. Around 1,300 Greek Cypriots were displaced from the village following the Turkish invasion of Cyprus in 1974. The village was then chosen as the location for the resettlement of displaced Turkish Cypriots from Mari, but only 100 were resettled in the village as most of them insisted on being closer to the cities. The village was nevertheless renamed Tatlısu in 1975 after the Turkish name of Mari. The rest of the village was repopulated by Turkish farmers who were settled from areas such as Konya, Adana, Araklı, Osmaniye, Çaykara, Kahramanmaraş and Gaziantep. In the 21st century, following the construction boom in Northern Cyprus, a number of Turkish Cypriots and Europeans bought real estate in the village.

== Politics ==
The town is administered by the Turkish Cypriot Tatlısu Municipality, founded in 1975. The current mayor is A. Hayri Orçan from the Democratic Party.

== Infrastructure ==
In 2014, a new town hall was inaugurated.

On 21 January 2026, the government of Northern Cyprus opened Tatlisu Health Center.

== Culture, sports, and tourism ==
Turkish Cypriot Tatlısu Sports Club was founded in 1950, and is now in Cyprus Turkish Football Association (CTFA) K-PET 2nd League.

== International relations ==
=== Twin towns – sister cities ===
Akanthou is twinned with:

- Tarsus, Mersin, Turkey
- Sumqayit, Azerbaijan (since 2005)
- Altınova, Yalova, Turkey
