= Asparuhovo, Burgas Province =

Asparuhovo Аспарухово
- Village
- Location in Bulgaria
- Coordinates: 42.516667°N 27.116667°E
- Country: Bulgaria
- Province: Burgas Province
- Municipality: Karnobat Municipality
- Time zone: UTC+2 (EET)
  - Summer (DST): UTC+3 (EEST)

Asparuhovo is a village in Karnobat Municipality, in Burgas Province, in southeastern Bulgaria.
