= Agios Epiktitos =

Agios Epiktitos: Άγιος Επίκτητος (Greek); Çatalköy (Turkish)
- Location in Cyprus
- Coordinates: 35°19′18″N 33°23′18″E
- Country (de jure): Cyprus
  - District: Kyrenia District
- Country (de facto): Northern Cyprus
  - District: Girne District

Government
  - Type: Municipality
  - Mayor: Mehmet Hulusioglu

Population (2011)
  - Total: 5,110
  - Municipality: 5,652
- Time zone: UTC+2 (EET)
  - Summer (DST): UTC+3 (EEST)
- Website: Turkish Cypriot municipality

Agios Epiktitos (Greek: Άγιος Επίκτητος; Turkish: Çatalköy) is a village in Cyprus, located 6 km (4 mi) east of Kyrenia. Agios Epiktitos, is under the de facto control of Northern Cyprus.The village was named after an ascetic monk who fled the Saracens in Palestine in the 9th Century and was a colleague of Saint Ambrose of Kyrenia who gave his name to a village close by.

The Turkish Cypriot Agios Epiktitos Municipality was founded in 1980.

== Culture, sports, and tourism ==
Turkish Cypriot Düzkaya Sports Club, located in Agios Epiktitos, was founded in 1958, and now in Cyprus Turkish Football Association (CTFA) K-PET 1st League.

== Twin towns – sister cities ==
Agios Epiktitos is twinned with:

- Altınova, Turkey
- Zabrat, Azerbaijan (since 2005)
- Kaş, Antalya, Turkey (since 2015)
