= Stari Grad, Sarajevo =

Municipality in Bosnia and Herzegovina

Stari Grad Стари Град Old Town
- Municipality
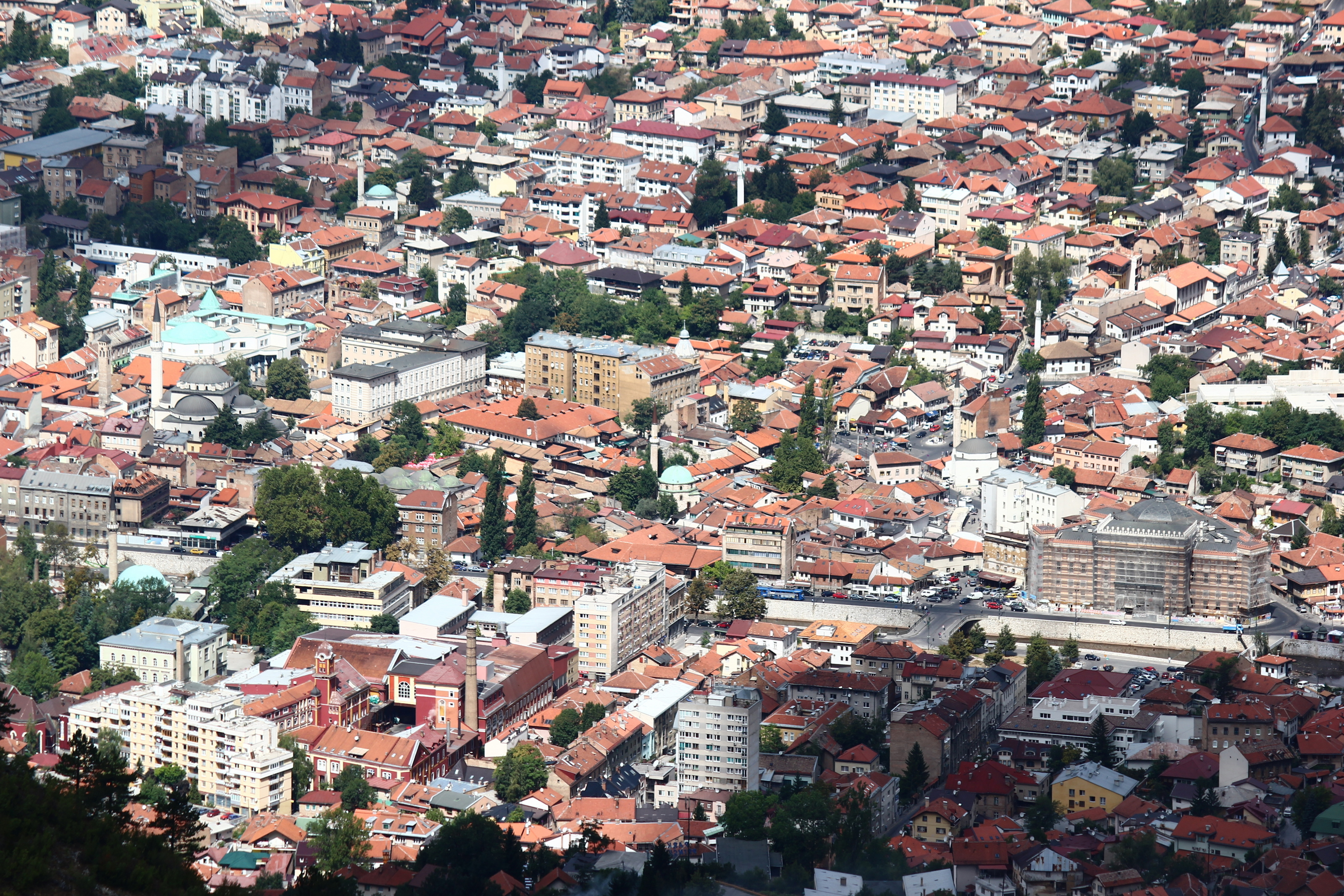
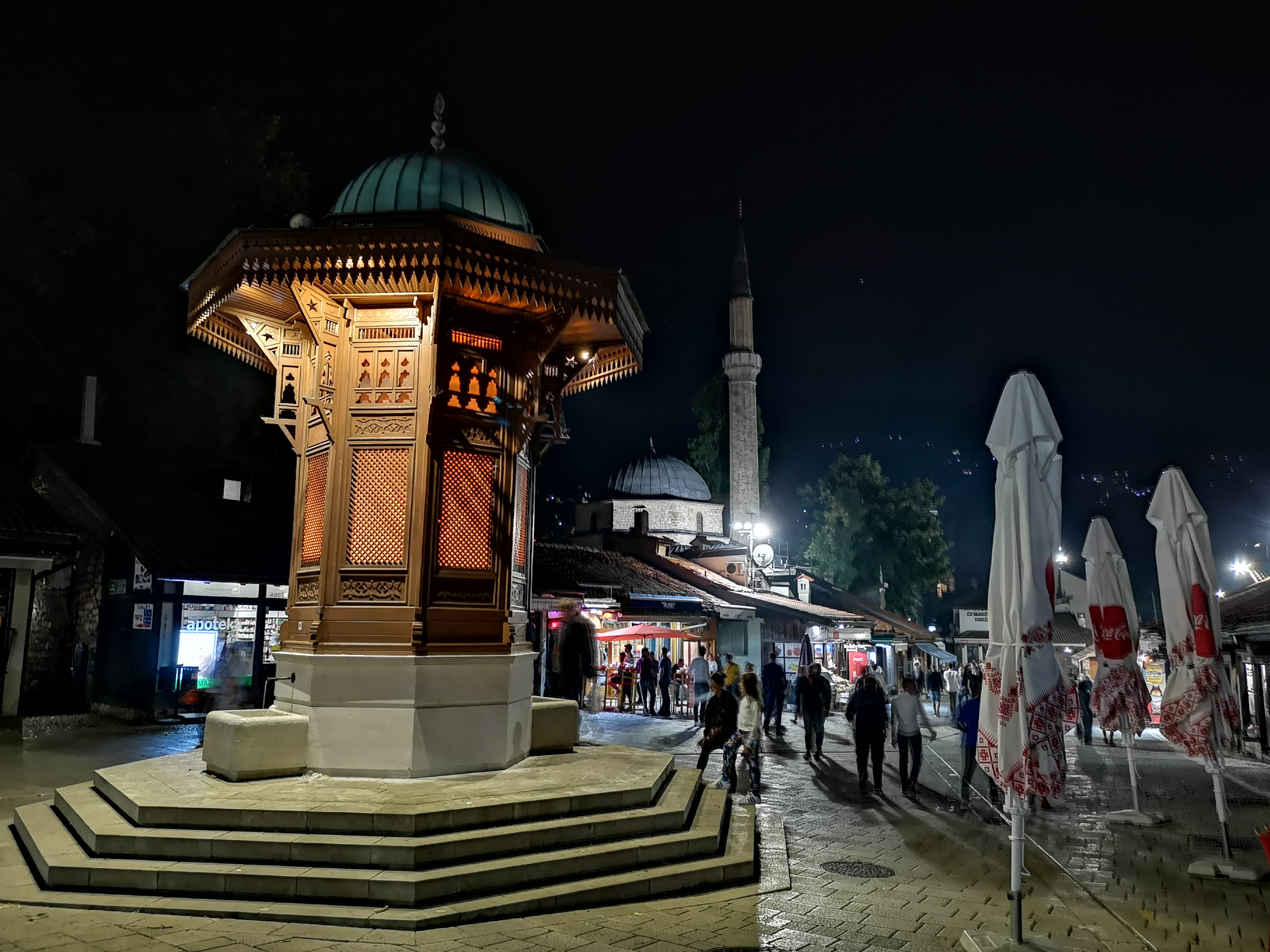
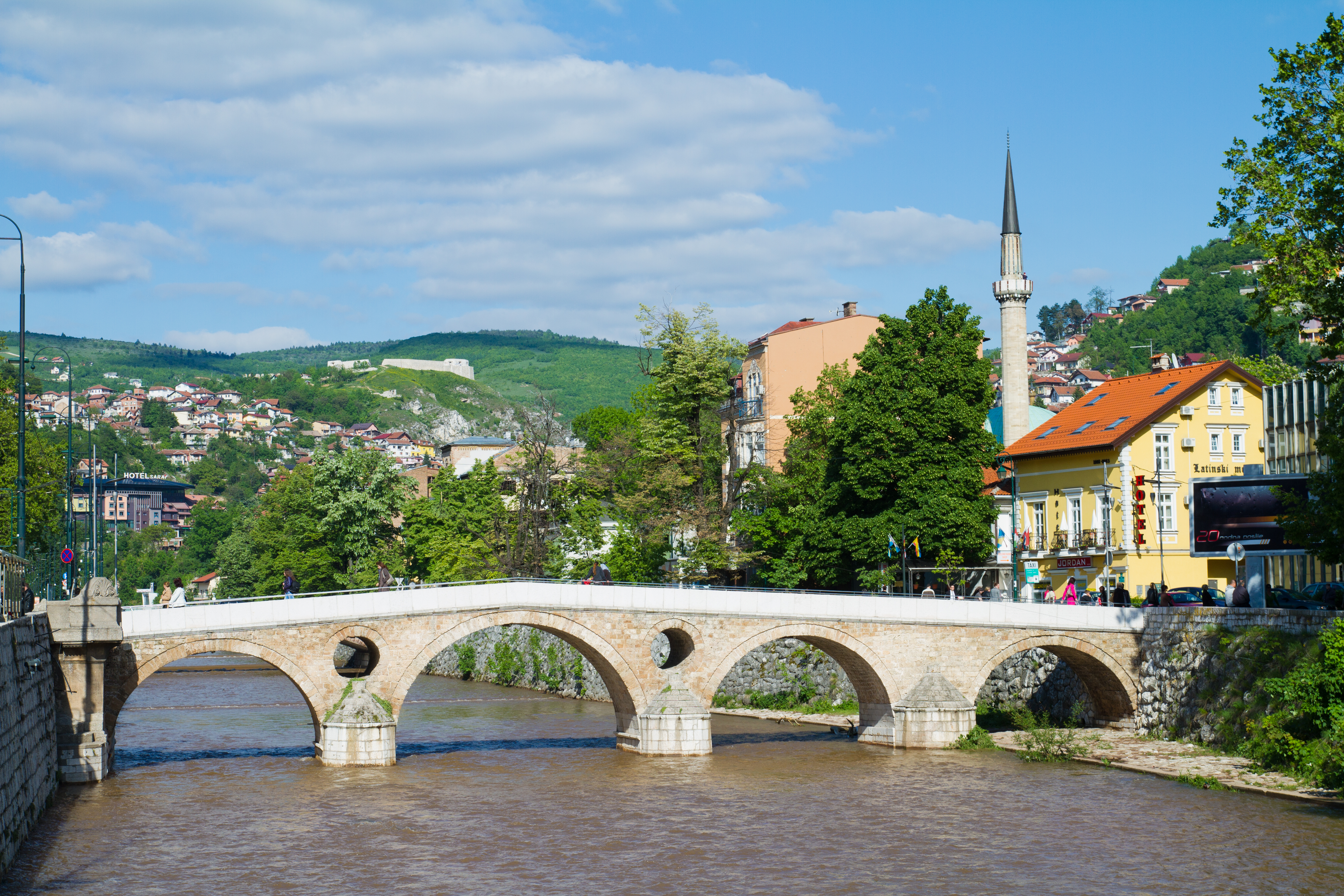
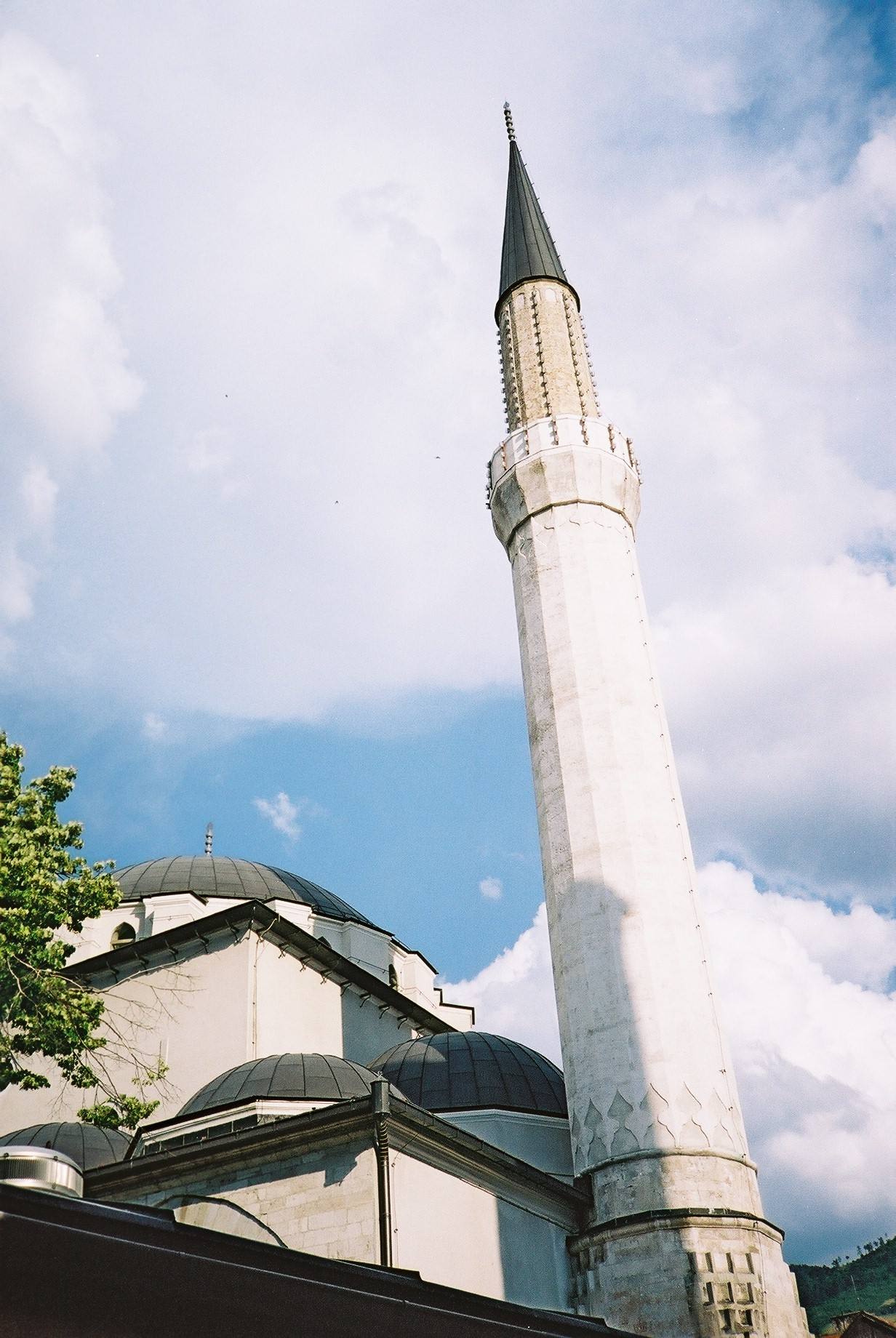
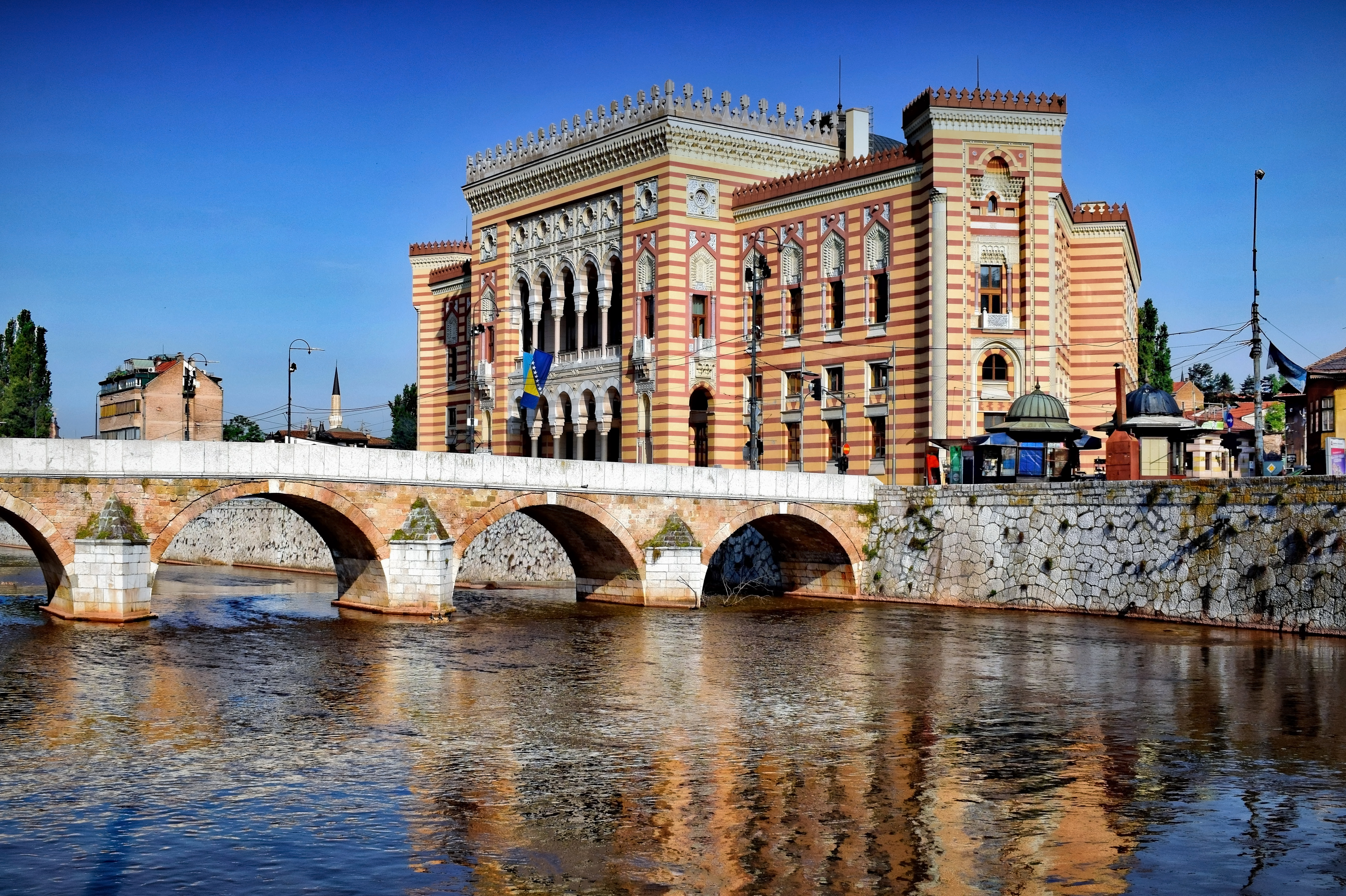
- Stari Grad skyline Sebilj Latin Bridge Gazi Husrev-beg Mosque Vijećnica

- Coat of arms

- Location of Stari Grad, Sarajevo within Bosnia and Herzegovina.
- Coordinates: 43°52′N 18°26′E
- Country: Bosnia and Herzegovina
- Entity: Federation of Bosnia and Herzegovina
- Canton: Sarajevo Canton
- City: Sarajevo
- Status: Urban

Government
  - Municipal mayor: Irfan Čengić (SDP BiH)

Area
  - Total: 51.4 km^{2} (19.8 sq mi)

Population (2013)
  - Total: 36,976
  - Density: 757/km^{2} (1,960/sq mi)
- Time zone: UTC+1 (CET)
  - Summer (DST): UTC+2 (CEST)
- Area code: +387 33
- Website: http://www.starigrad.ba

Stari Grad (Serbian Cyrillic: Стари Град, pronounced [stâːriː grâːd]; lit. "Old Town") is a municipality of the city of Sarajevo, Bosnia and Herzegovina. It is the oldest and most historically significant part of Sarajevo. At its heart is the Baščaršija, the old town market sector where the city was founded by Ottoman general Isa-Beg Ishaković in the 15th century.

== Features ==
The municipality of Stari Grad is characterized by its many religious structures, and examples of unique Bosnian architecture. The eastern half of Stari Grad consists of the Ottoman influenced sectors of the city, while the western half showcases an architecture and culture that arrived with Austria-Hungary, symbolically representing the city as a meeting place between East and West.

The population of Stari Grad is 36,976, making it the least populous of Sarajevo's four municipalities. Its population density of 742.5 inhabitants per km^{2} also ranks it last among the four. Stari Grad contains numerous hotels and tourist attractions including the Gazi Husrev-beg Mosque, Emperor's Mosque, the Sarajevo Cathedral and more.

== Politics ==
The municipal mayor of Stari Grad is Irfan Čengić from the Social Democratic Party.

The municipal council has 24 seats in total, which are allocated as follows:

1. Social Democratic Party - 8 seats
2. Party of Democratic Action - 8 seats
3. Democratic Front - 4 seats
4. People and Justice - 4 seats
5. Our Party - 2 seats
6. Party for Bosnia and Herzegovina - 2 seats
7. Independent - 2 seats
8. People's European Union - 1 seat
9. Forward - 1 seat

== Local communities ==
The Stari Grad municipality consists of the following 16 local communities:

- Babića Bašća
- Baščaršija
- Bistrik
- Ferhadija
- Hrid - Jarčedoli
- Kovači
- Logavina
- Mahmutovac
- Medrese
- Mjedenica
- Mošćanica
- Sedrenik
- Širokača
- Sumbuluša
- Toka - Džeka
- Vratnik

== Demographics ==
=== 1971 ===
126,598 total

- Bosniaks - 74,354 (58.73%)
- Serbs - 27,658 (21.84%)
- Croats - 12,903 (10.19%)
- Yugoslavs - 5,944 (4.69%)
- Others - 5,739 (4.55%)

=== 1991 ===
50,744 total

- Bosniaks - 39,410 (77.66%)
- Serbs - 5,150 (10.14%)
- Croats - 1,126 (2.21%)
- Yugoslavs - 3,374 (6.64%)
- Others - 1,684 (3.35%)

=== 2013 ===
36,976 total

- Bosniaks - 32,794 (88.68%)
- Croats - 685 (1.85%)
- Serbs - 467 (1.26%)
- Others - 3,030 (8.19%)

== Sites ==
Prior to 1914, the Austro-Hungarians who ruled Sarajevo wanted land in the Sarajevo Old Town district to build a city hall and library. The land had a home on it and, despite offering the owner money, he refused and continued to refuse even when told that he had to move. When the officials threatened him, he moved the house and rebuilt it, piece by piece, on the other side of the Miljacka river, as a way of spiting the officials. The Sarajevo spite house operates today as a restaurant, called "Inat Kuća", which means "Spite House."

== Gallery ==
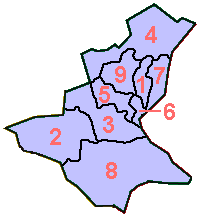
No. 7 on this map of the Sarajevo Canton.

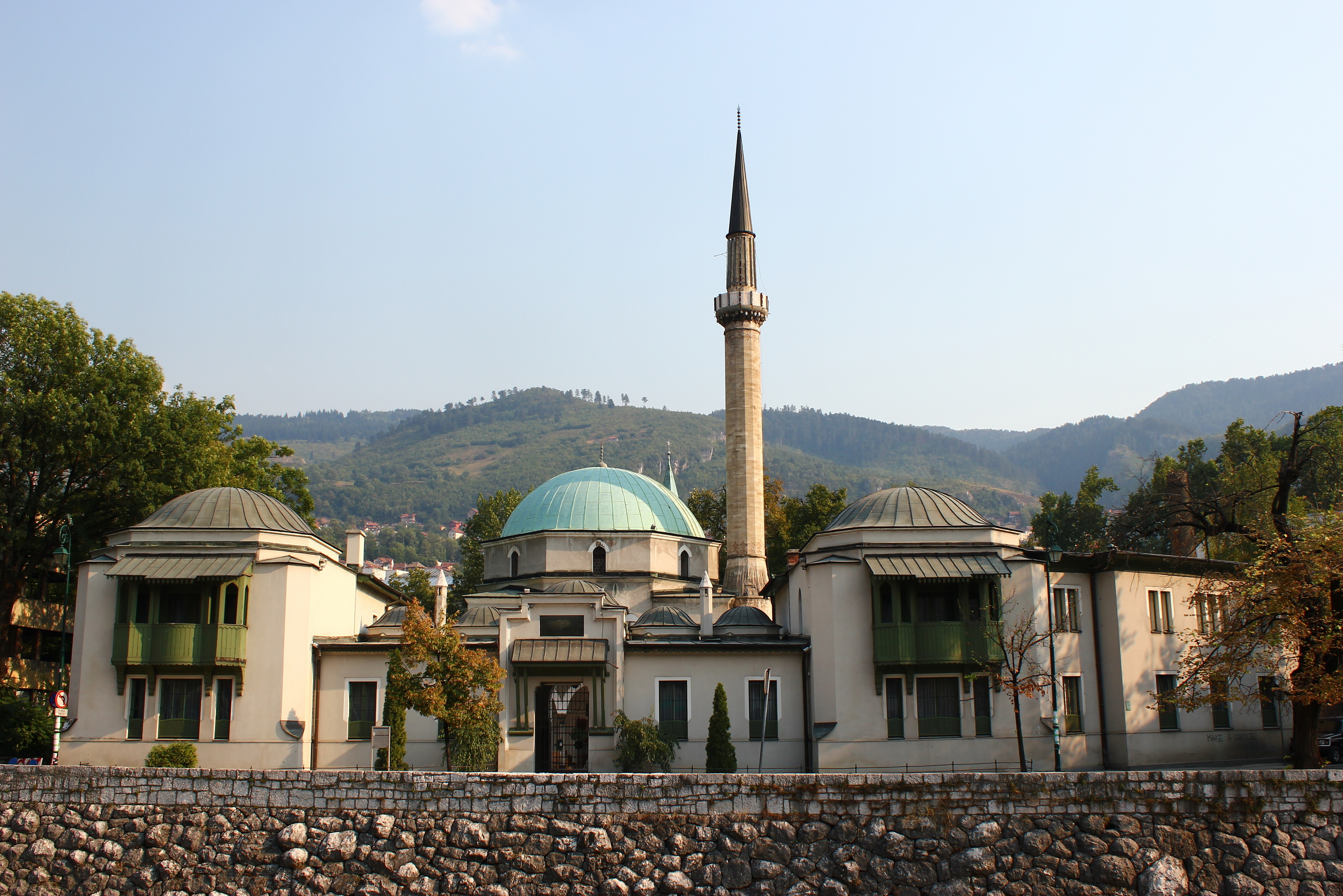
The Emperor's Mosque.

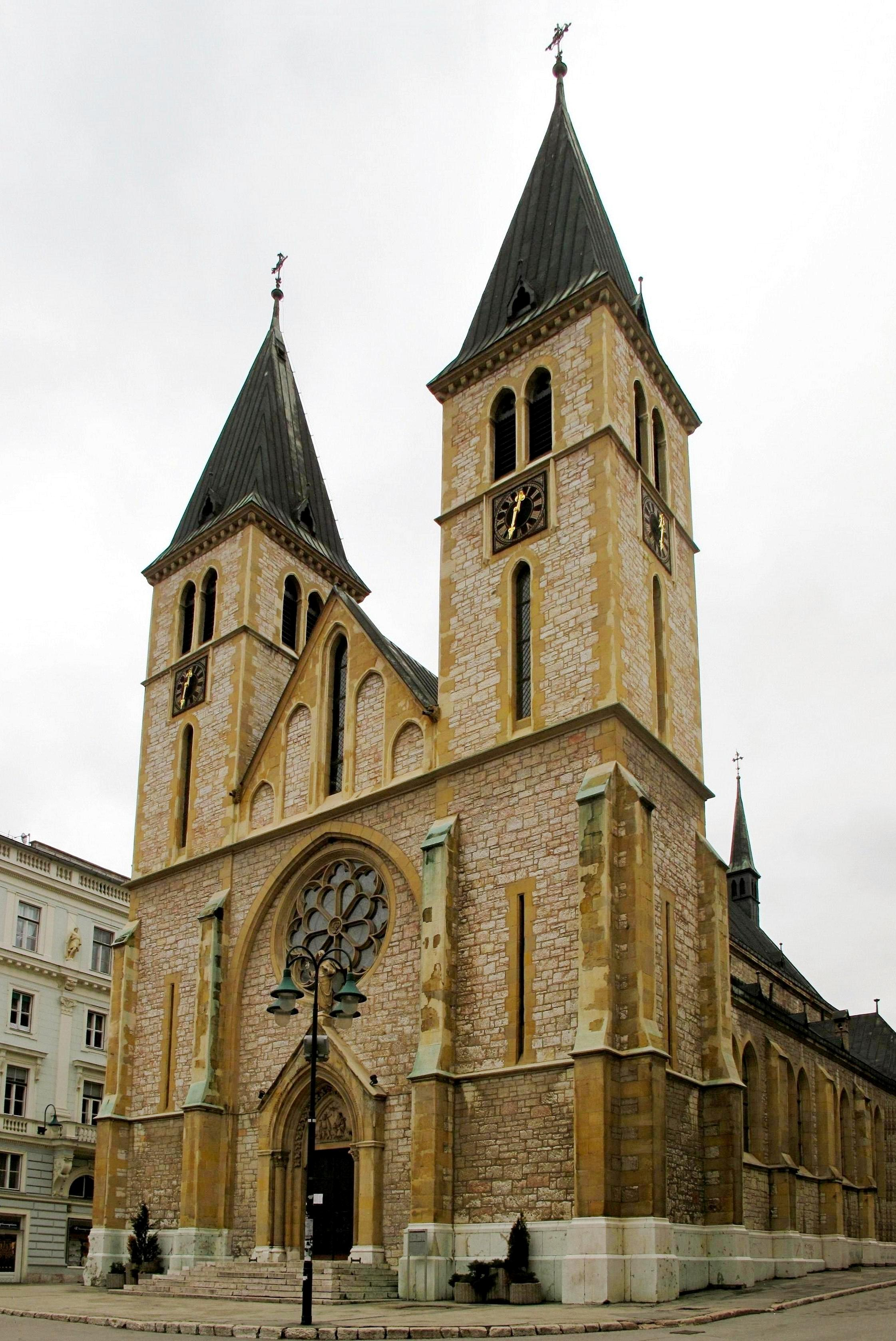
The Sarajevo cathedral.

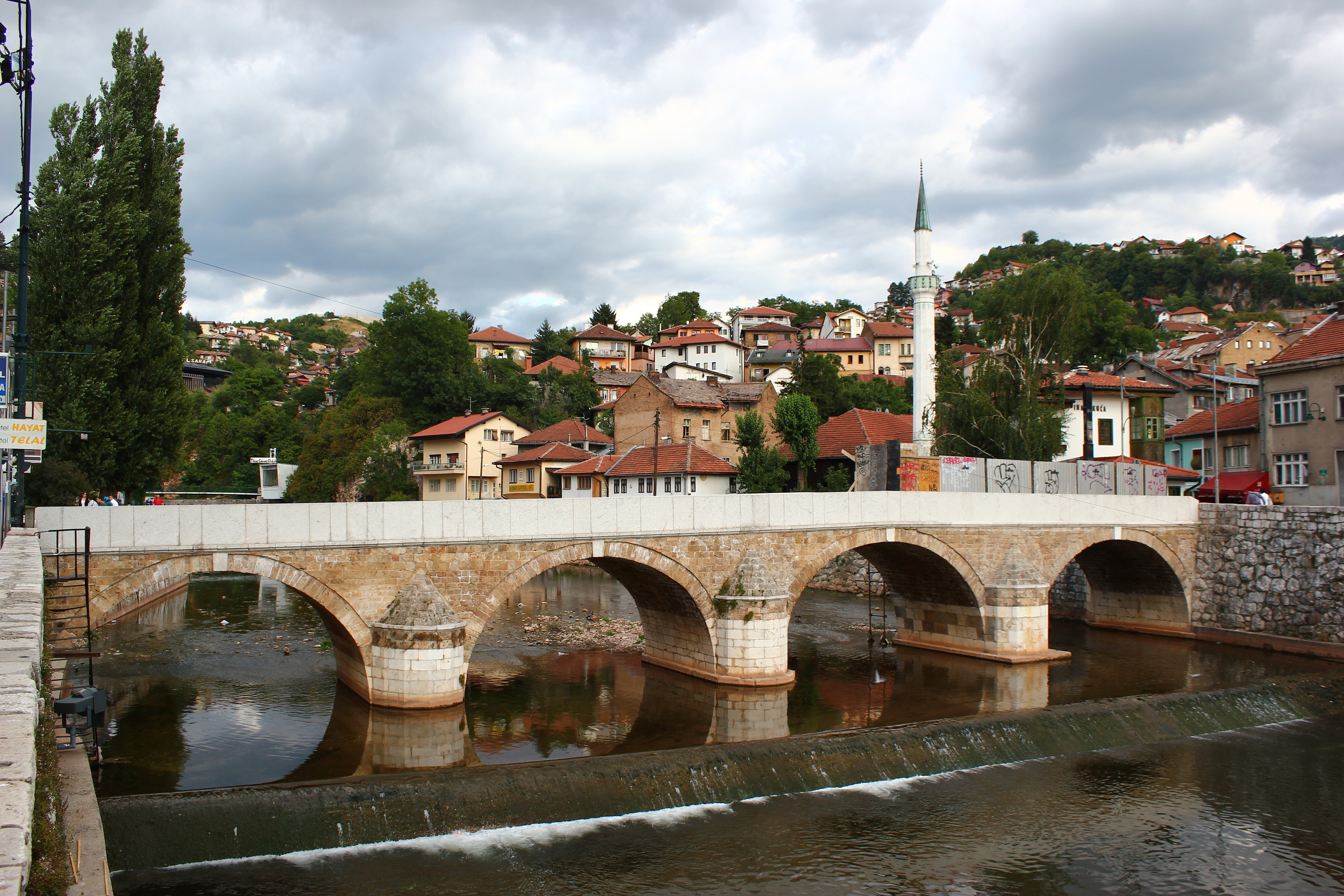
Šeher-Ćehaja Bridge.

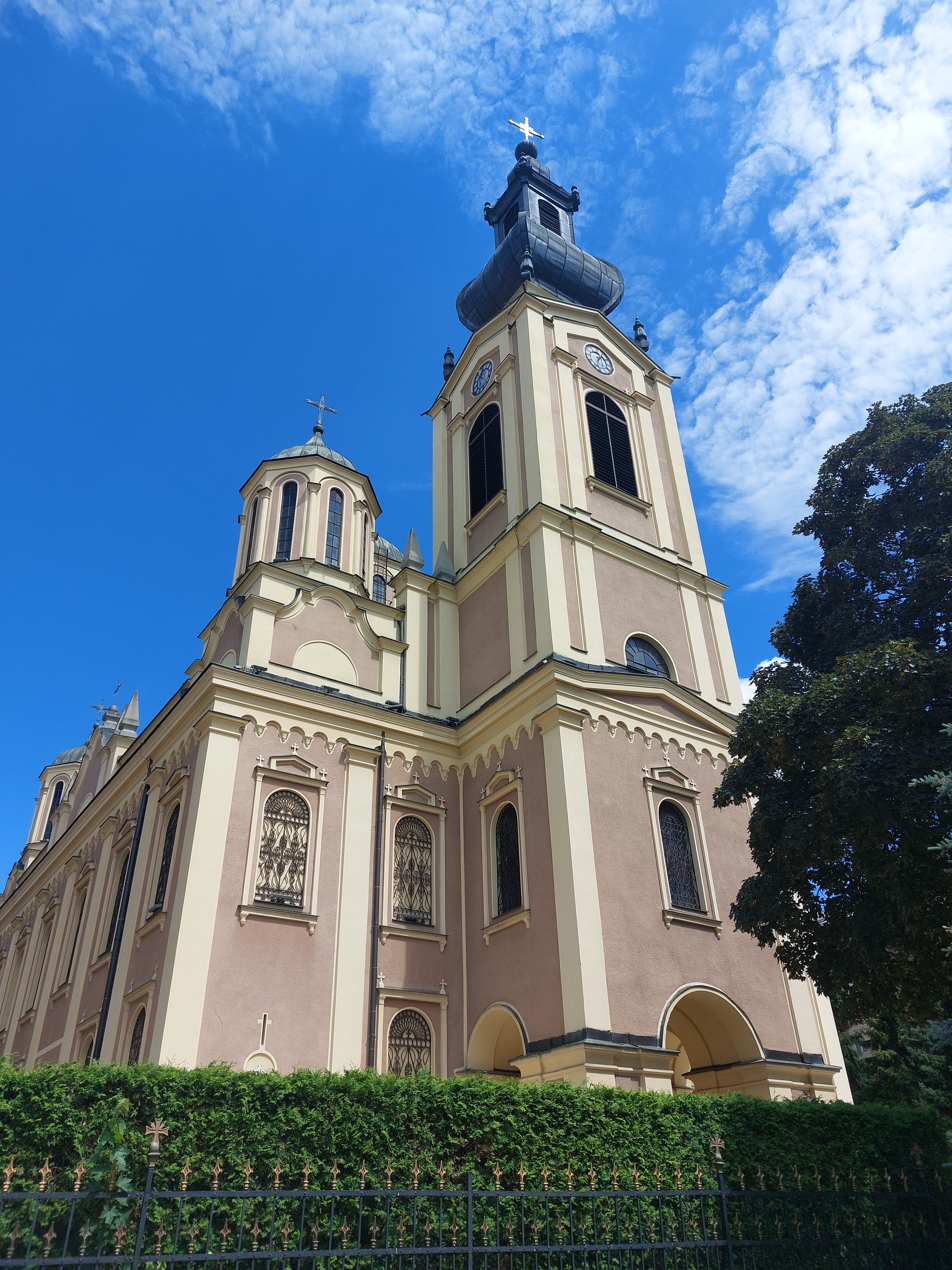
The Cathedral of the Nativity of the Theotokos.

== See also ==
- Sarajevo
- Sarajevo Canton
