= Ashkenazi (surname) =

Ashkenazi (Hebrew: אַשְׁכְּנַזִּי) is a surname of Jewish origin. The term Ashkenaz (Hebrew: אַשְׁכְּנַז) refers to the area along the Rhine in Western Europe where diaspora Jews settled and formed communities during the Middle Ages.

The usage of Ashkenazi (lit. of Ashkenaz) as a surname originated as a sobriquet for Ashkenazi Jews who had resettled in culturally Sephardic Jewish communities within the Ottoman Empire and North Africa. Due to assimilation of those Jews in the dominant Sephardic culture, today the name is mainly held by Sephardic Jews despite the name suggesting the direct paternal line is ultimately Ashkenazic. It was the fourth most common surname among the Jews of Istanbul, and is common in Israel, where many Sephardic Jews live.

Variant spellings include Ashkenazy, Aschkenasi, Ashkenasi, and Eskenazi.

== People ==
- Abraham Ashkenazi, 19th-century rabbi, Chacham Bashi of Jerusalem
- Adi Ashkenazi (born 1975), Israeli actress, comedian and television host
- Ben Ashkenazi (born 1994), Australian cricketer
- Benjamin Ashkenazi (1824–1894), Russian communal worker and philanthropist
- Bezalel Ashkenazi, 16th-century rabbi and Talmud scholar
- Dan Ashkenazi (13th century), German Talmudist
- David Ashkenazi (1915–1997), Russian pianist, accompanist and composer
- Eliezer ben Elijah Ashkenazi (1512–1585), rabbi, Talmudist, and physician
- Gabi Ashkenazi (born 1954), former Chief of the Israel Defense Forces General Staff
- Goga Ashkenazi (born 1980), Kazakh-Russian businesswoman
- Israel Sarug Ashkenazi (16th century), pupil of Isaac Luria
- Jacob ben Isaac Ashkenazi (1550–1625), rabbi and author of the Tseno Ureno
- Judah Ashkenazi (18th century), rabbi and author of the Ba'er Hetev
- Léon Ashkenazi (1922–1996), French rabbi and Jewish leader
- Lior Ashkenazi (born 1969), Israeli actor
- Malkiel Ashkenazi (16th century), Sephardic rabbi in Hebron
- Meir Ashkenazi (16th century), envoy of the Khan of Crimea
- Menachem Ashkenazi (1934–2000), Israeli football referee
- Mordechai ben Hillel Ashkenazi (1250–1298), German rabbi and legal authority
- Moses Ashkenazi (died 1701), also known as Johann Peter Spaeth, German convert to Judaism
- Moses David Ashkenazi (died 1856), rabbi of Tolcsva and Safed
- Motti Ashkenazi (born 1940), Israeli reserve captain
- Tzvi Ashkenazi (1656–1718), rabbi of Amsterdam
- Vladimir Ashkenazy (born 1937), Soviet-born Icelandic pianist, chamber music performer, and conductor
- Yisroel ben Shmuel Ashkenazi of Shklov (1770–1839), Lithuanian Talmudist
- Yitzhak Ashkenazi (1534–1572), also called Isaac Luria, rabbi and mystic, founder of an important branch of Kabbalah
