= Karel Pařík =

Czech-born Bosnian architect (1857–1942)

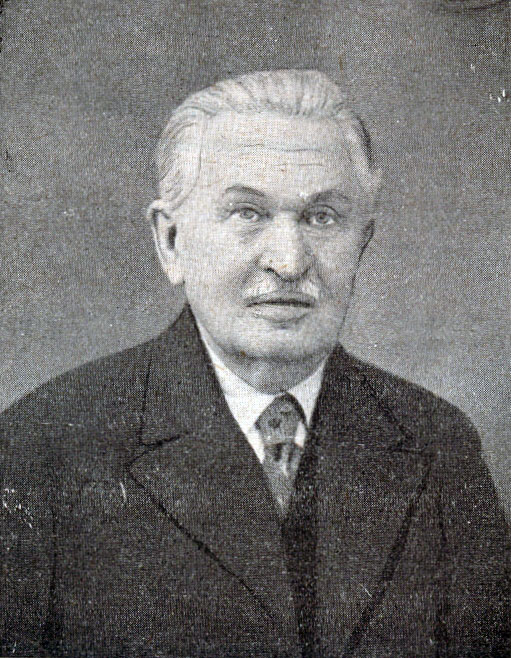
- Born: 4 July 1857; Veliš u Jičína, Austrian Empire
- Died: 16 June 1942 (aged 84); Sarajevo, Independent State of Croatia (modern-day Bosnia and Herzegovina)
- Occupation: Architect

Karel Pařík (4 July 1857 – 16 June 1942) was a Czech-born architect in the Austro-Hungarian empire. Pařík spent most of his life in Sarajevo where he designed over seventy major buildings, which are today classified among the most beautiful in Bosnia and Herzegovina. For Bosnians, he is also known as Karlo Paržik and is considered as "The builder of Sarajevo". He died working on his last project, Sarajevo City Hall, which later became one of the symbols of the city. "Czech by birth, Sarajevan by choice" stands encrypted on his gravestone in Sarajevo.

== Biography ==
Born in Veliš near Jičín in 1857, Pařík moved to Sarajevo at the age of 26, after the Austro-Hungarian occupation of Bosnia and Herzegovina. He designed around 150 buildings in Bosnia, 70 of them in Sarajevo. Today, they house important Sarajevo institutions such as the National Museum of Bosnia and Herzegovina, the Sarajevo National Theatre, the Faculty of Islamic Sciences, the Ashkenazi Synagogue, as well as government offices and schools.

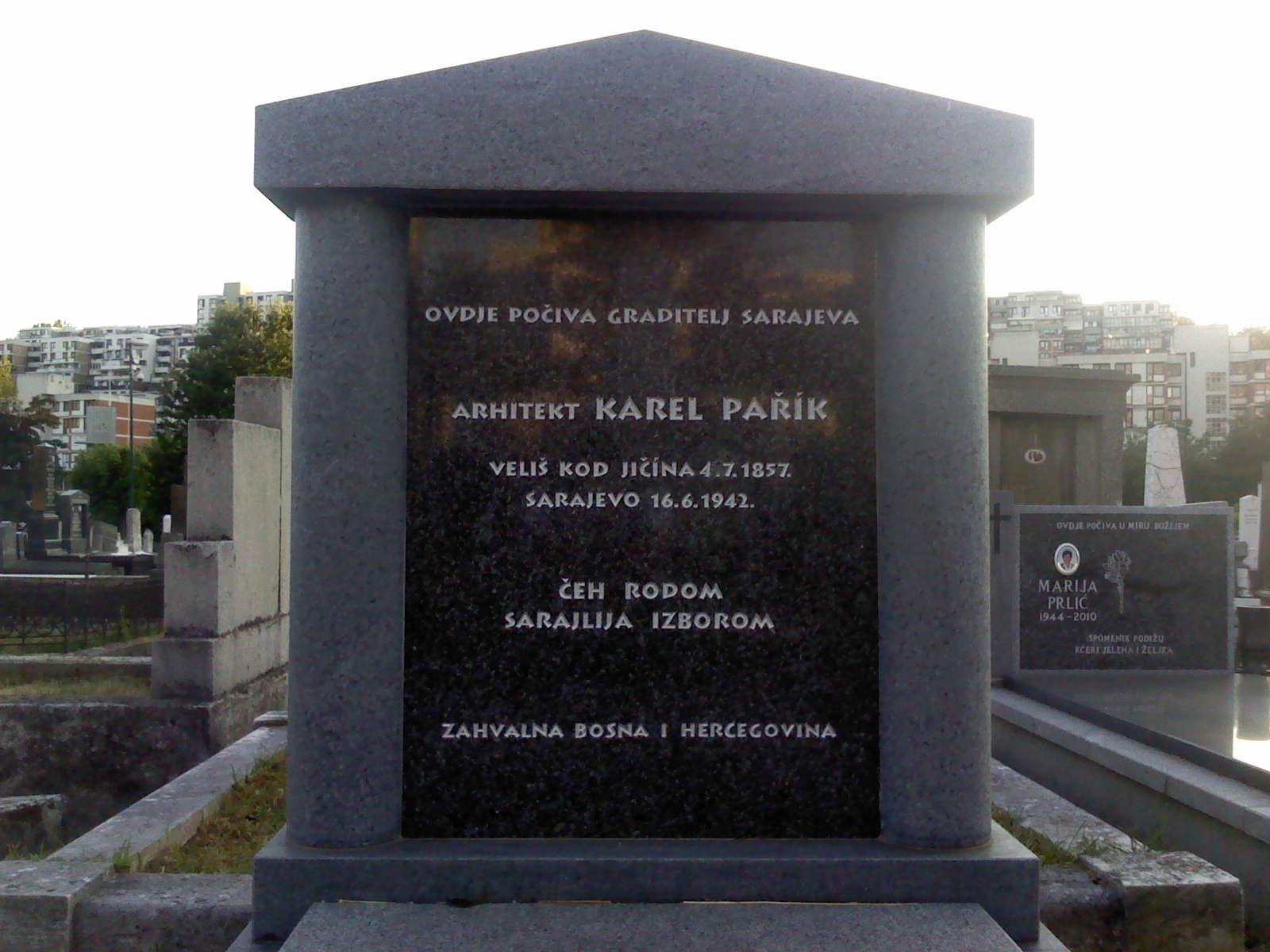
Karel Pařík's grave in Sarajevo. The epitaph reads: "Here rests the builder of Sarajevo. Czech by birth, Sarajevan by choice. - A thankful Bosnia and Herzegovina."

Pařík fought to maintain historical parts of Sarajevo and proposed construction of new parts of the city away from the old town. He placed his personal mark and made great contributions to the urbanization of Sarajevo and Bosnia and Herzegovina during the Austro-Hungarian Empire. He is buried in the Koševo cemetery in Sarajevo.

== Works ==
Among Pařík's many works, a few that particularly stand out are:

- Hotel Europe - Pařík designed one of the Sarajevo's first modern hotels, the Hotel Evropa. It was constructed in 1882 and opened on 12 December 1882. For 110 years, it was the most spacious hotels in Sarajevo, from its opening until its destruction on 1 August 1992. Many poets, painters, artists of all types and politicians stayed in this hotel during the Austro-Hungarian Empire, the Kingdom of Yugoslavia and later in the Socialist Federal Republic of Yugoslavia. The hotel was reconstructed and officially reopened on 12 December 2008, on its 126th birthday.
- Sharia School (Faculty of Islamic Studies) - Among Pařík's first projects was the Sarajevo Sharia School. It was constructed in 1887 in a rich pseudo-Moorish decorative style with elements and details collected from various regional Islamic art schools. The Museum of the City of Sarajevo was opened in the building in 1949 which contained archaeological, historical, ethnographic and art collections. Today, the building is used as the Faculty of Islamic Sciences.
- National Museum of Bosnia and Herzegovina - The National Museum building is one of the most significant works by Pařík in Sarajevo. The museum was founded in 1885 and was open to the public on 1 March 1888. The building consists of four pavilions joined by a terrace and a botanical garden in the centre. The whole building of the National Museum was constructed in the spirit of the Neo-Renaissance and work on the building lasted until 1913.
- Vijećnica - where the National and University Library of Bosnia and Herzegovina was housed from 1946 to 1992. In 1891, Pařík began working on major building in Sarajevo, in the pseudo-Moorish style – the Municipal Hall, or as it is colloquially known the Vijećnica. Pařík did not want to accept the request of the governor, Benjamin Kallay, to make it very large and therefore he was fired. The construction was turned over to Alexander Wittek who was inspired by the Mosque of Kemal II in Cairo. After Wittek's death, the construction was completed under Ćiril Iveković's supervision in 1896. However, the building was built in the style originally conceived by Pařík. During the period of Yugoslavia, this building functioned as the National and University Library of Bosnia and Herzegovina. In the Bosnian war of the 1990s the building was destroyed and reconstruction was completed in 2014.
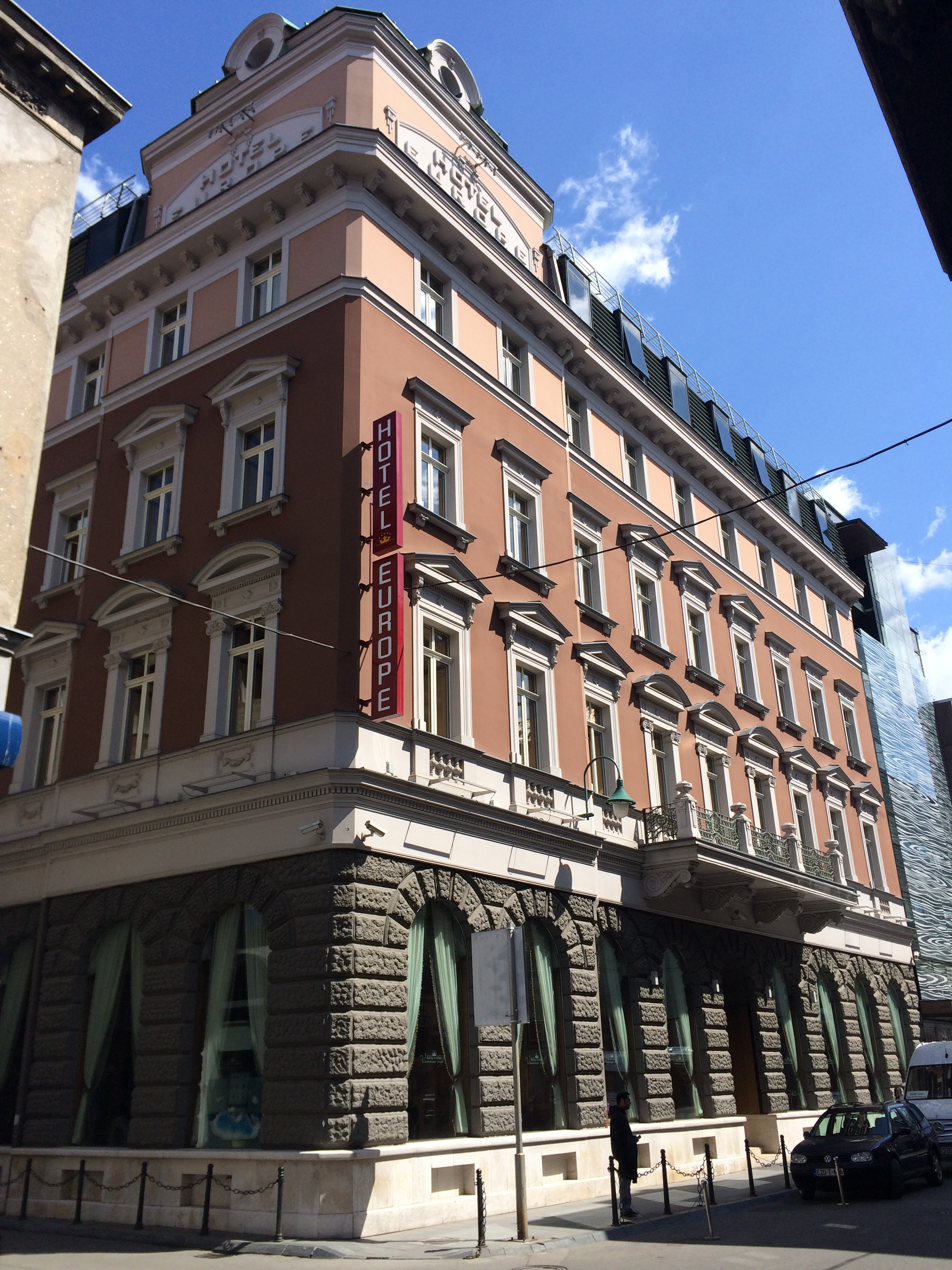
Hotel Evropa (1882)

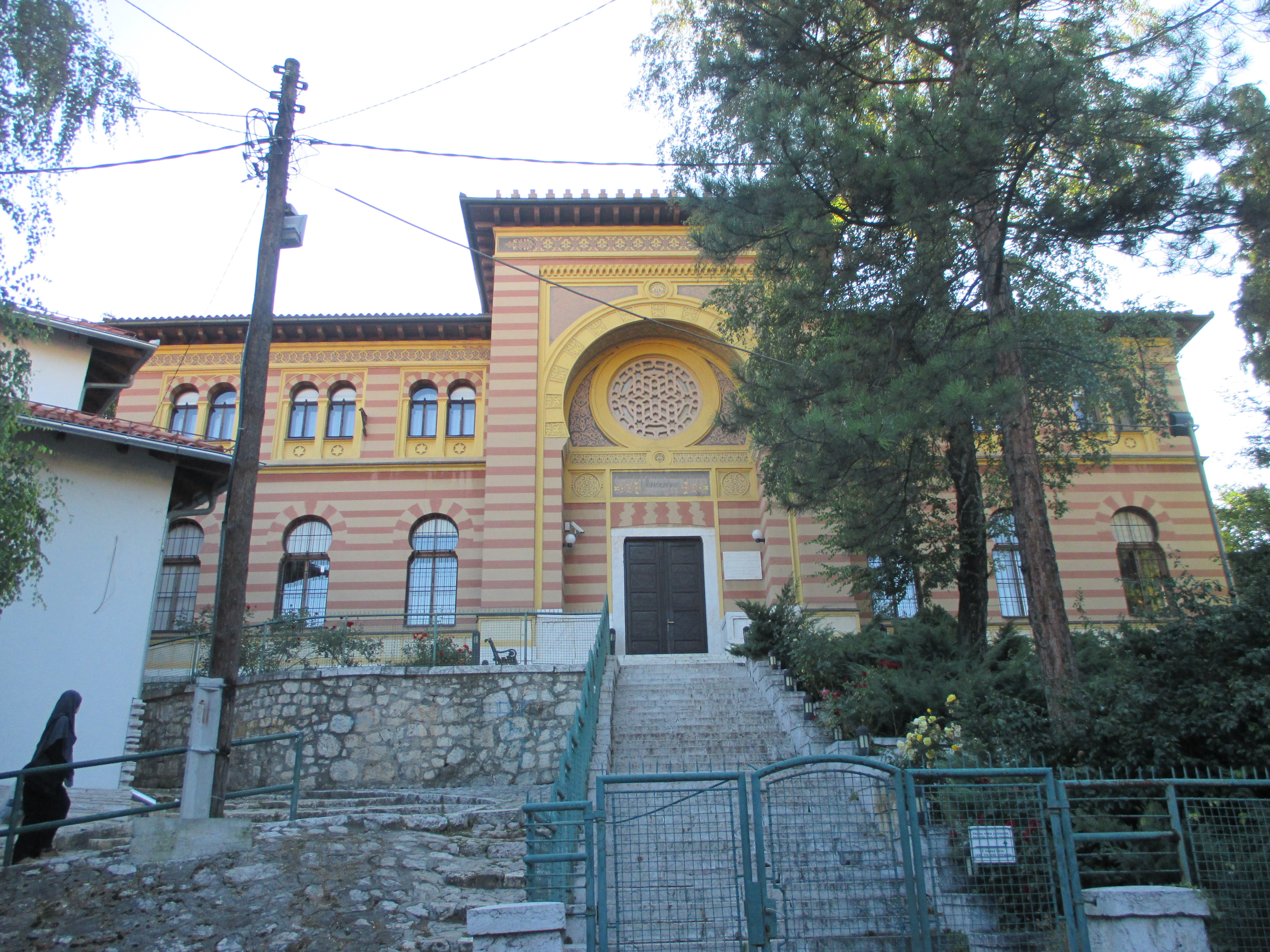
Faculty of Islamic Studies (1887)

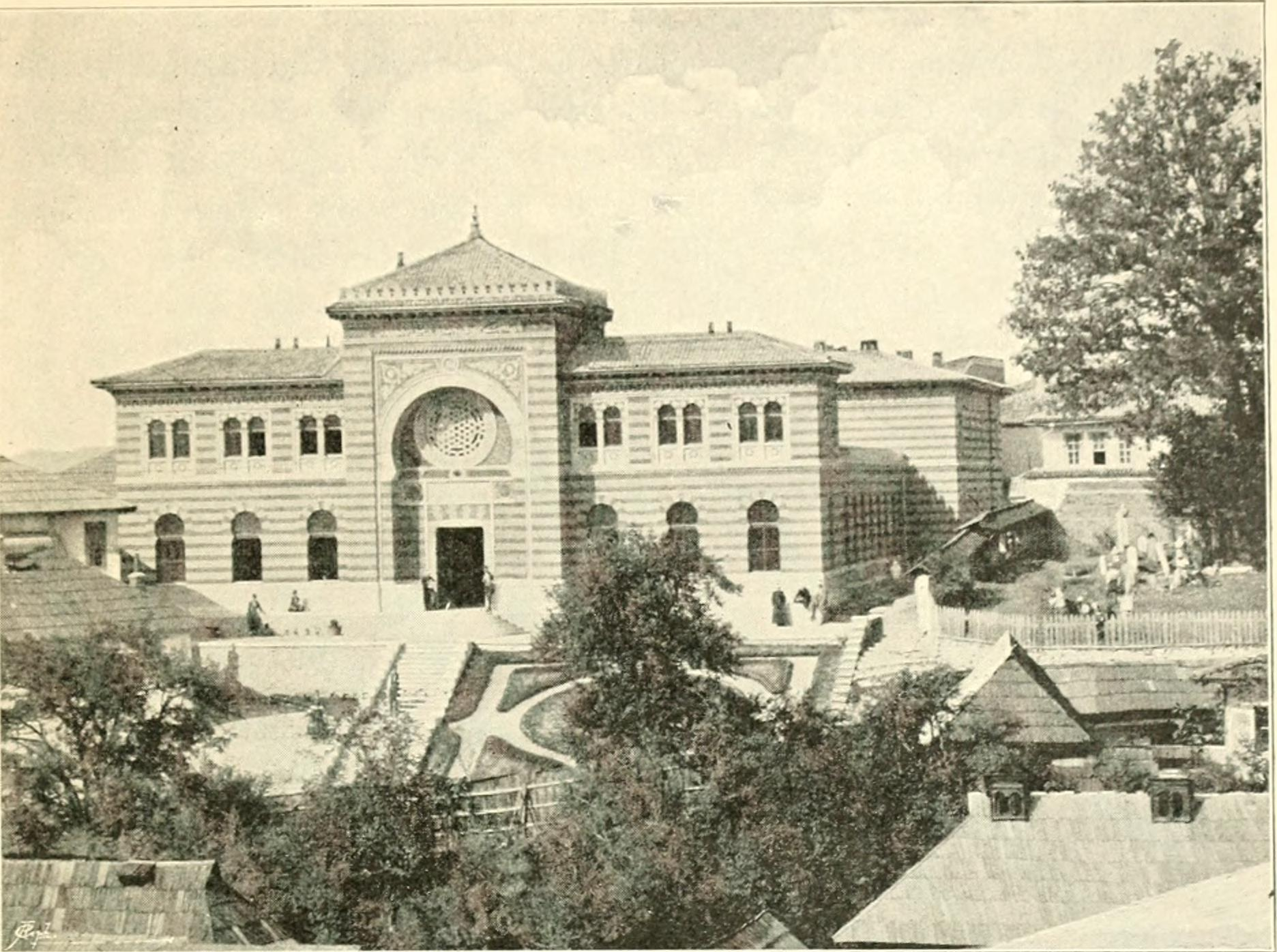
Faculty of Islamic Studies in 1897

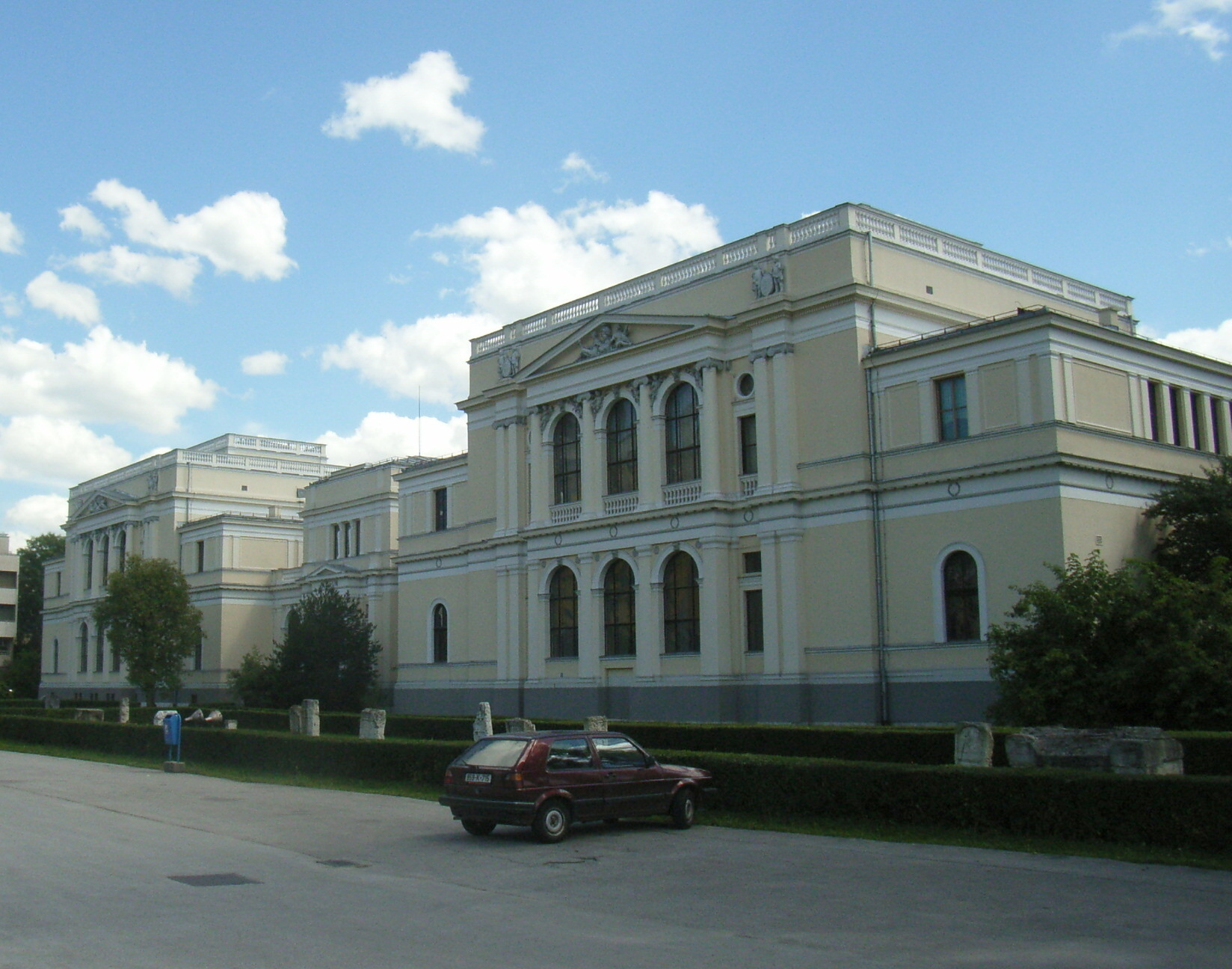
National Museum (1888)

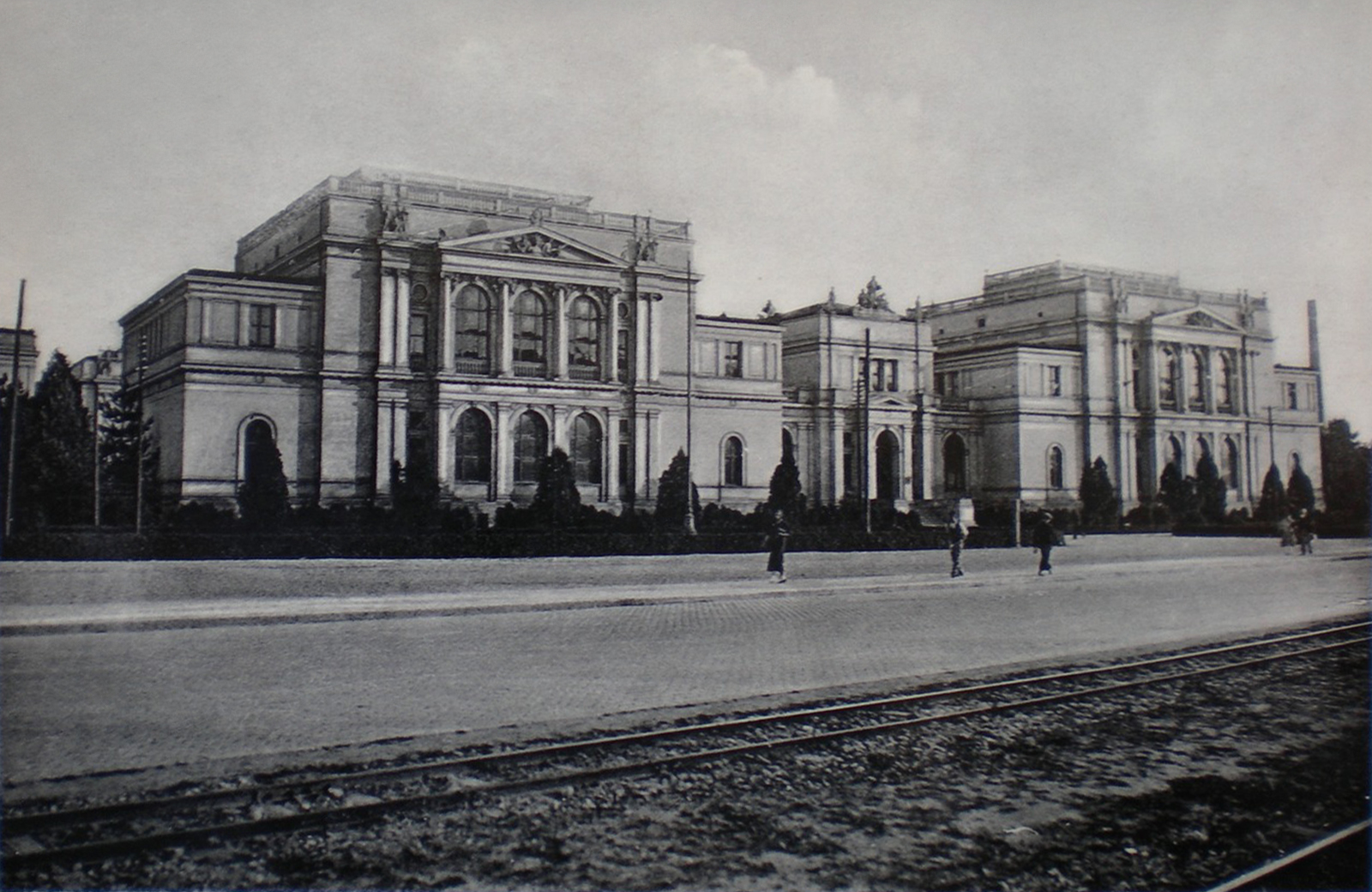
National Museum in 1935

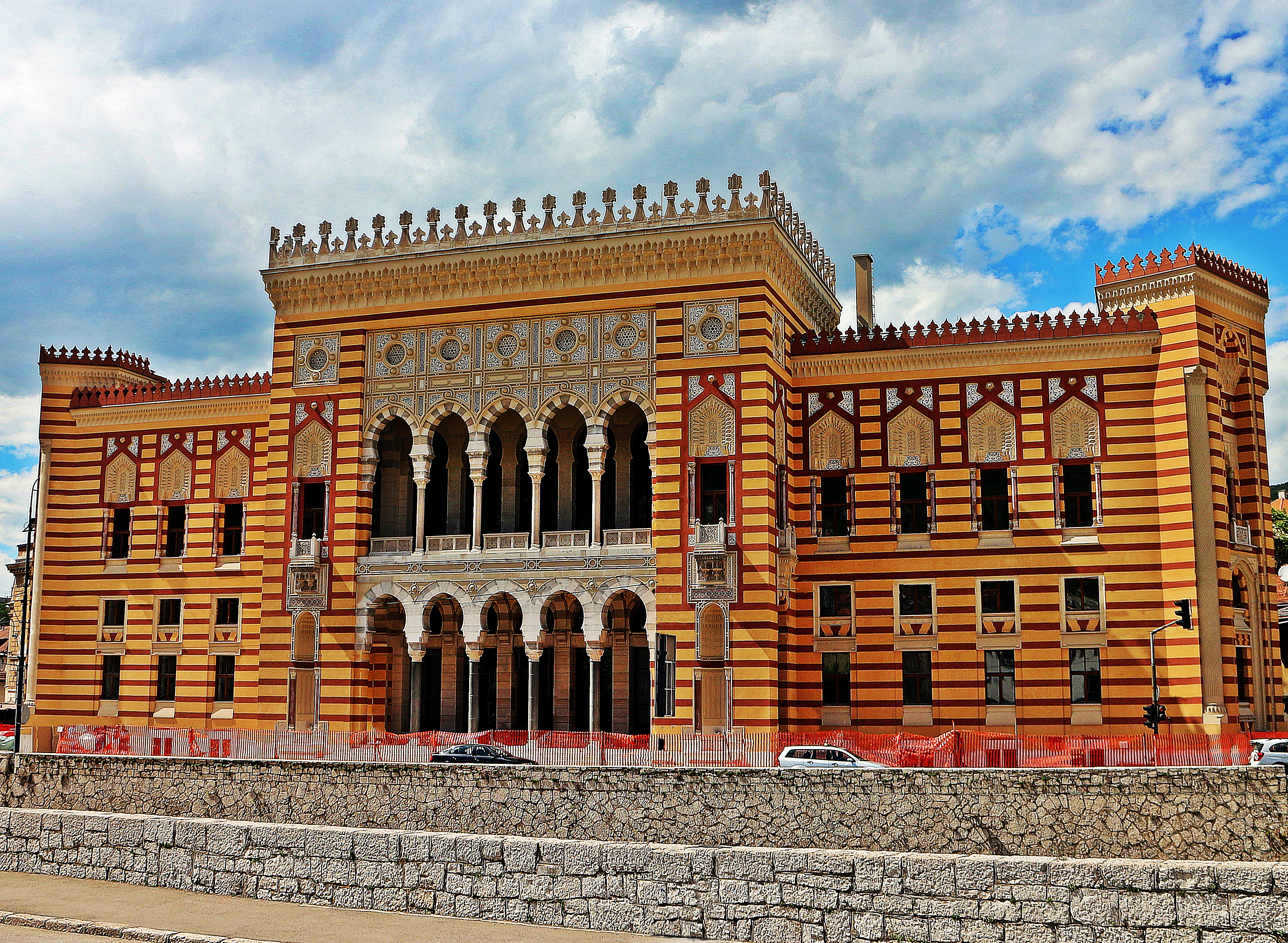
Vijećnica (1891–1896)
- Landesbank – Originally this building housed the Grand Hotel (Union Hotel). After World War Two, the hotel was known as Landesbank (Zemaljska banka – National Bank), then as a Service of Social Accounting, and today it houses the Department of payment processing. The building was erected in 1893 and the hotel opened in 1895. It was designed by Karel Pařík and his colleague Josip Vancaš. The façade was built in the spirit of early Renaissance and in 1946 Eternal Flame monument was added in front of its main entrance. The flame serves as a memorial monument for the Liberators of Sarajevo, and victim of fascism, who have fallen during the World War II.
- Academy of Fine Arts – Today's Academy of Fine Arts building originally housed the Evangelical Church. It was the only Evangelical church built during the Austro-Hungarian government and it was constructed in 1899. Pařík's design was inspired by the Romanic-Byzantine style. Additional wings of the building were completed in 1911.
- Ashkenazi Synagogue – During the Austro-Hungarian condominium Sephardic and Ashkenazy communities lived in Sarajevo. The Ashkenazy community came to Sarajevo after 1878 and began constructing a synagogue in 1901. The form of the temple is bejewelled with sharp-angled domes over large "drums" and covered with pseudo-Moorish decorations. During the construction, changes were made by Pařík and the building was completed in 1902.
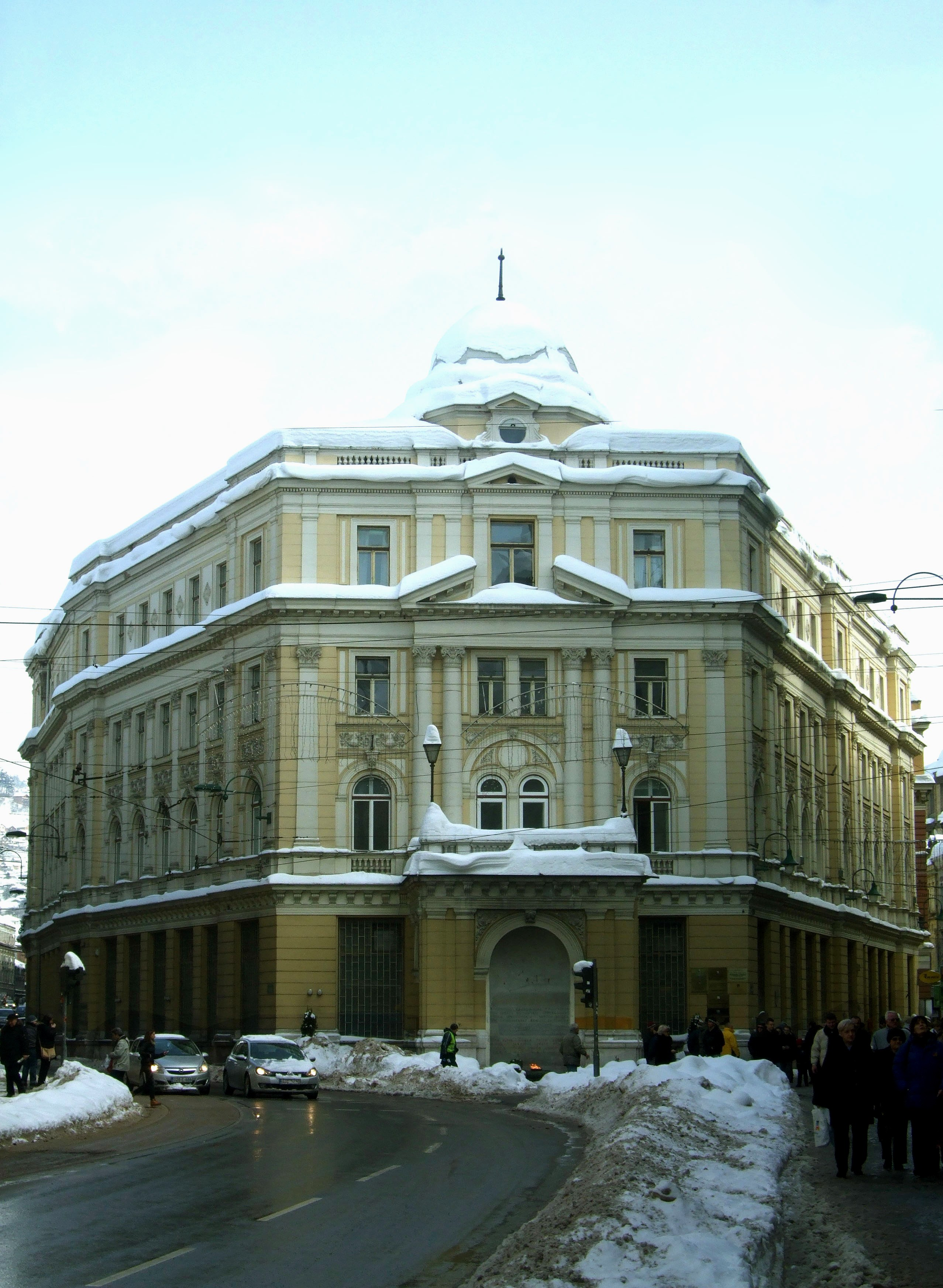
Landesbank building (1893)

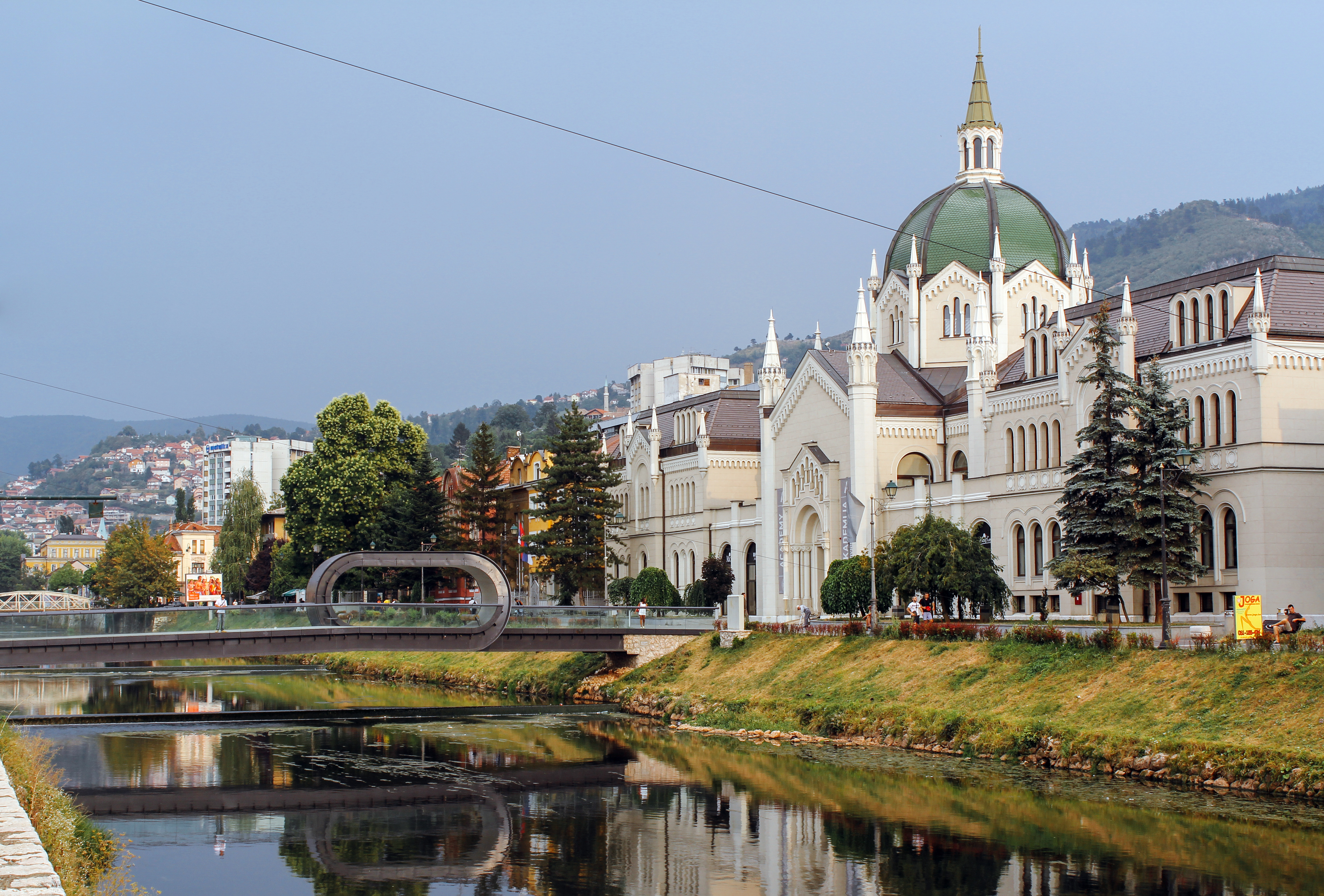
Academy of Fine Arts, originally Evangelical Church (1899)

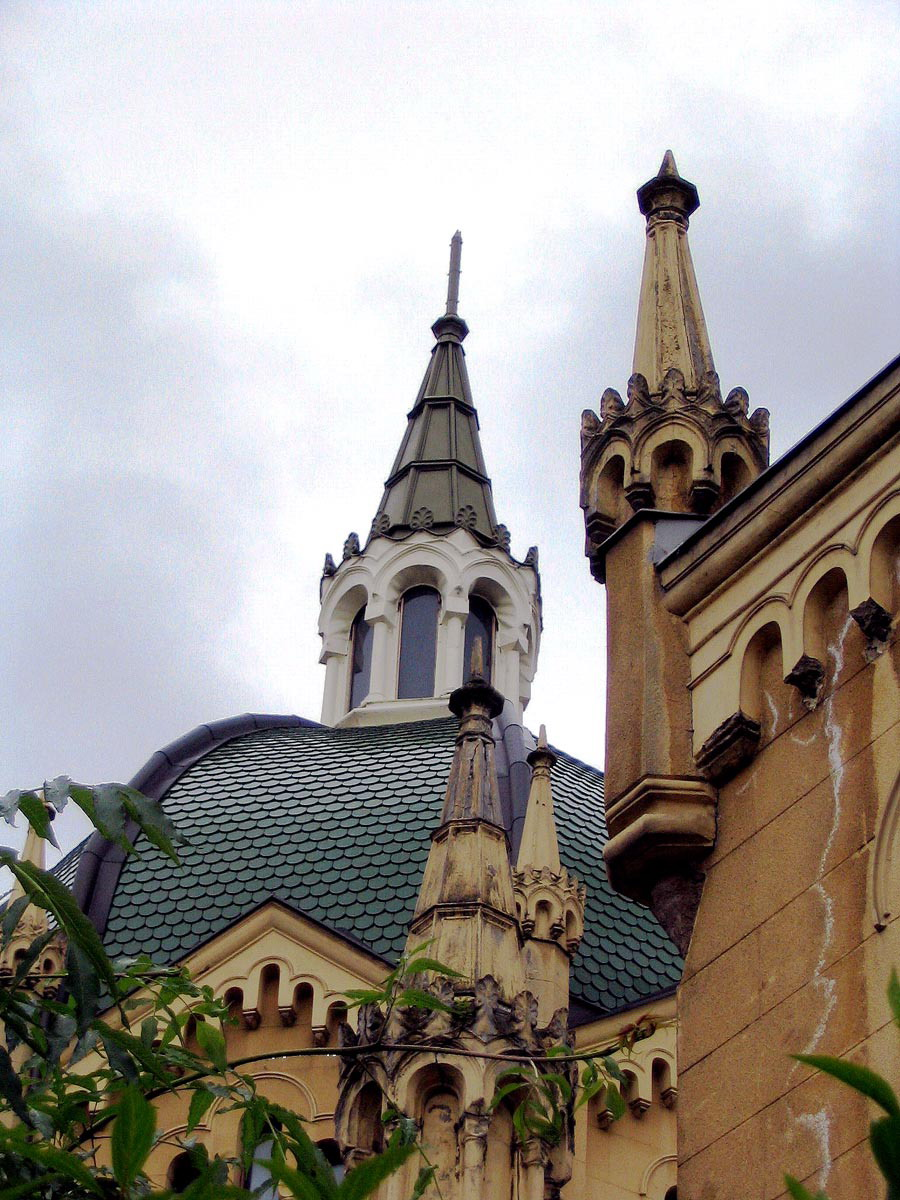
Dome and towers on the Academy of Fine Arts

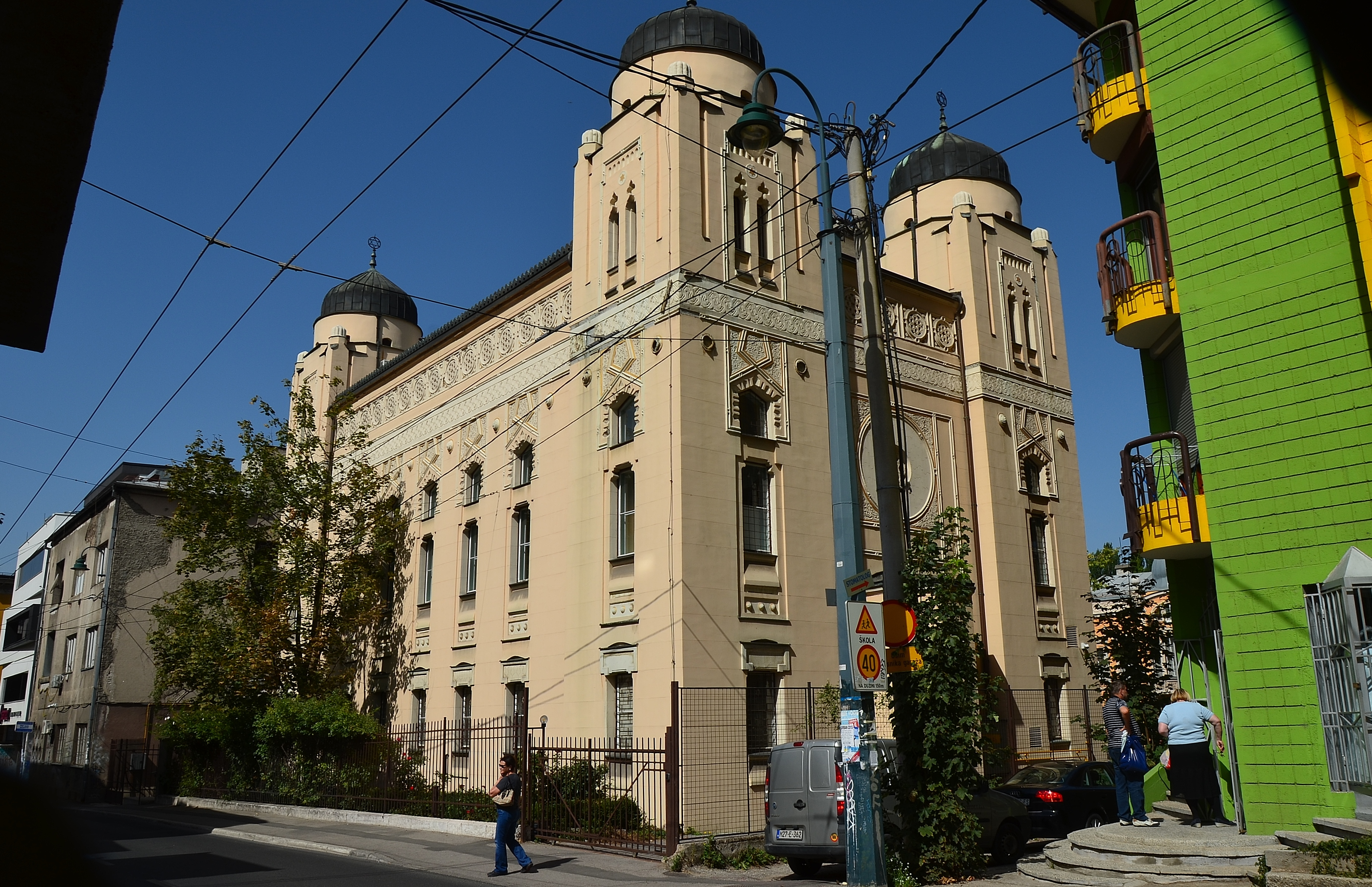
Ashkenazi Synagogue (1902)

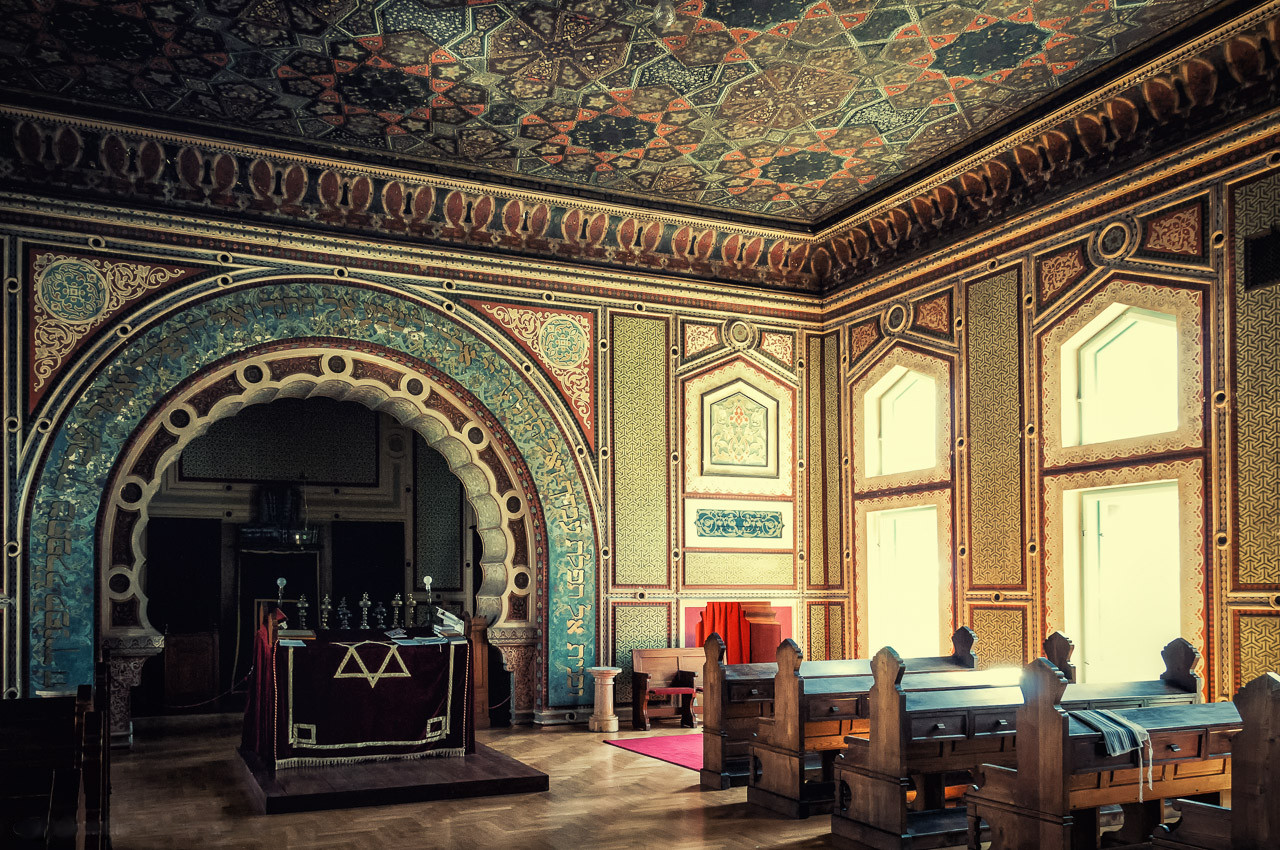
Interior of the Ashkenazi Synagogue
- Palace of Justice, today Law Faculty and Rectorate of the University of Sarajevo
- Provincial Government Building III, present-day Sarajevo Canton Building
- Sarajevo National Theatre (1921)
- Saint Joseph Catholic Church, Marijin Dvor (1936-1940)
- House of Karl Langer (today Embassy of Turkey)
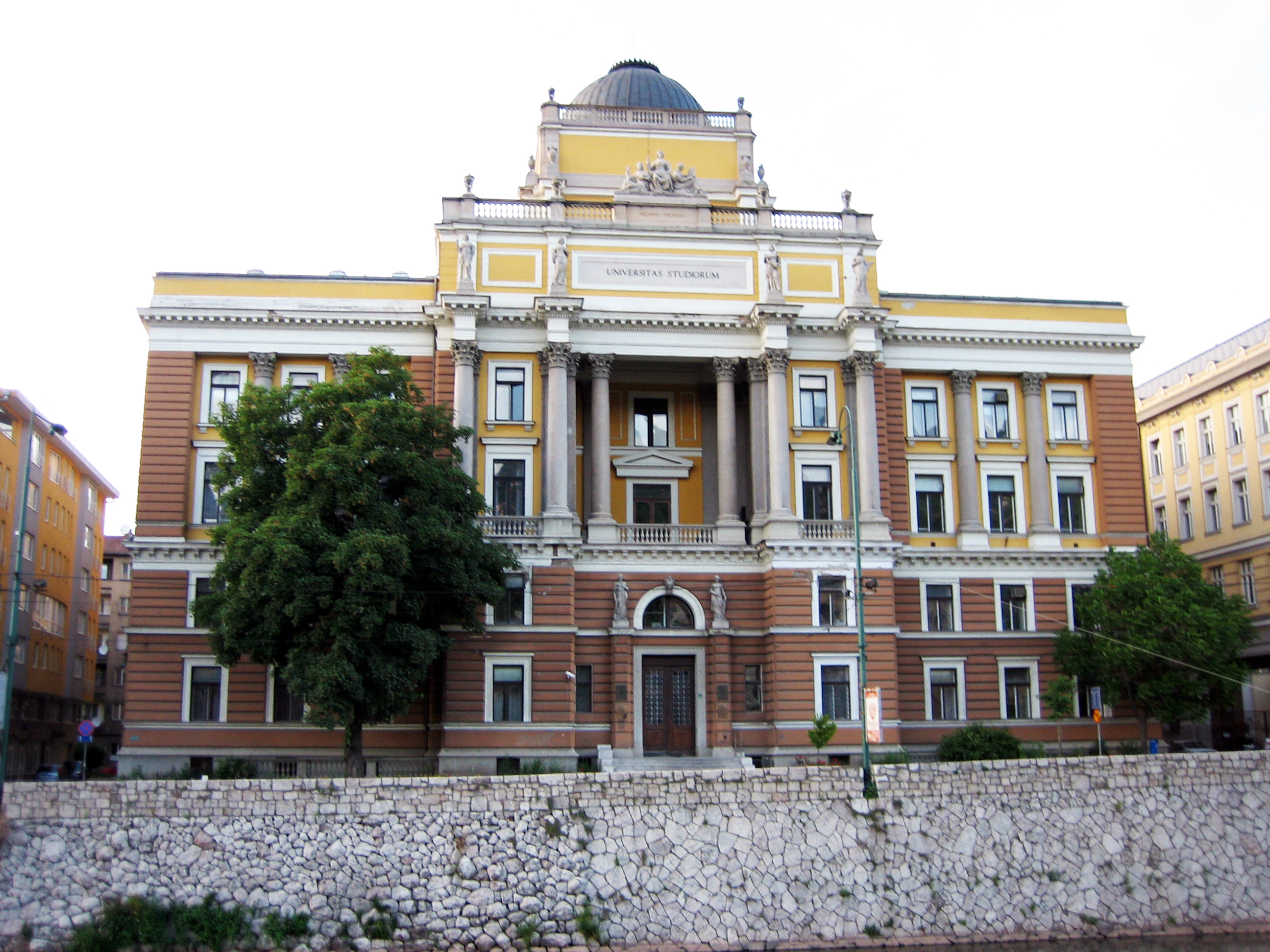
Palace of Justice, today's Rectorate

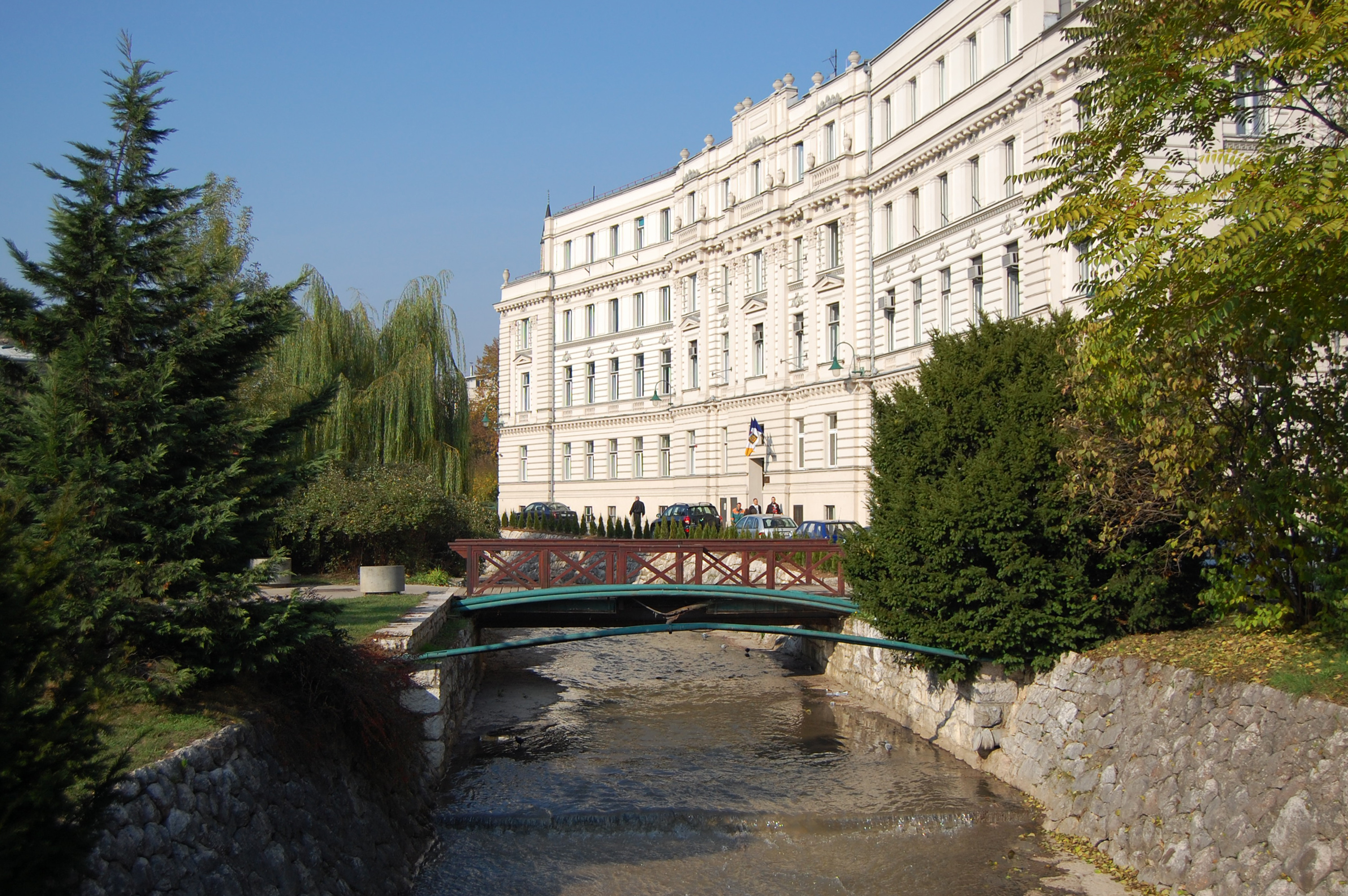
Sarajevo Canton Building (1906)

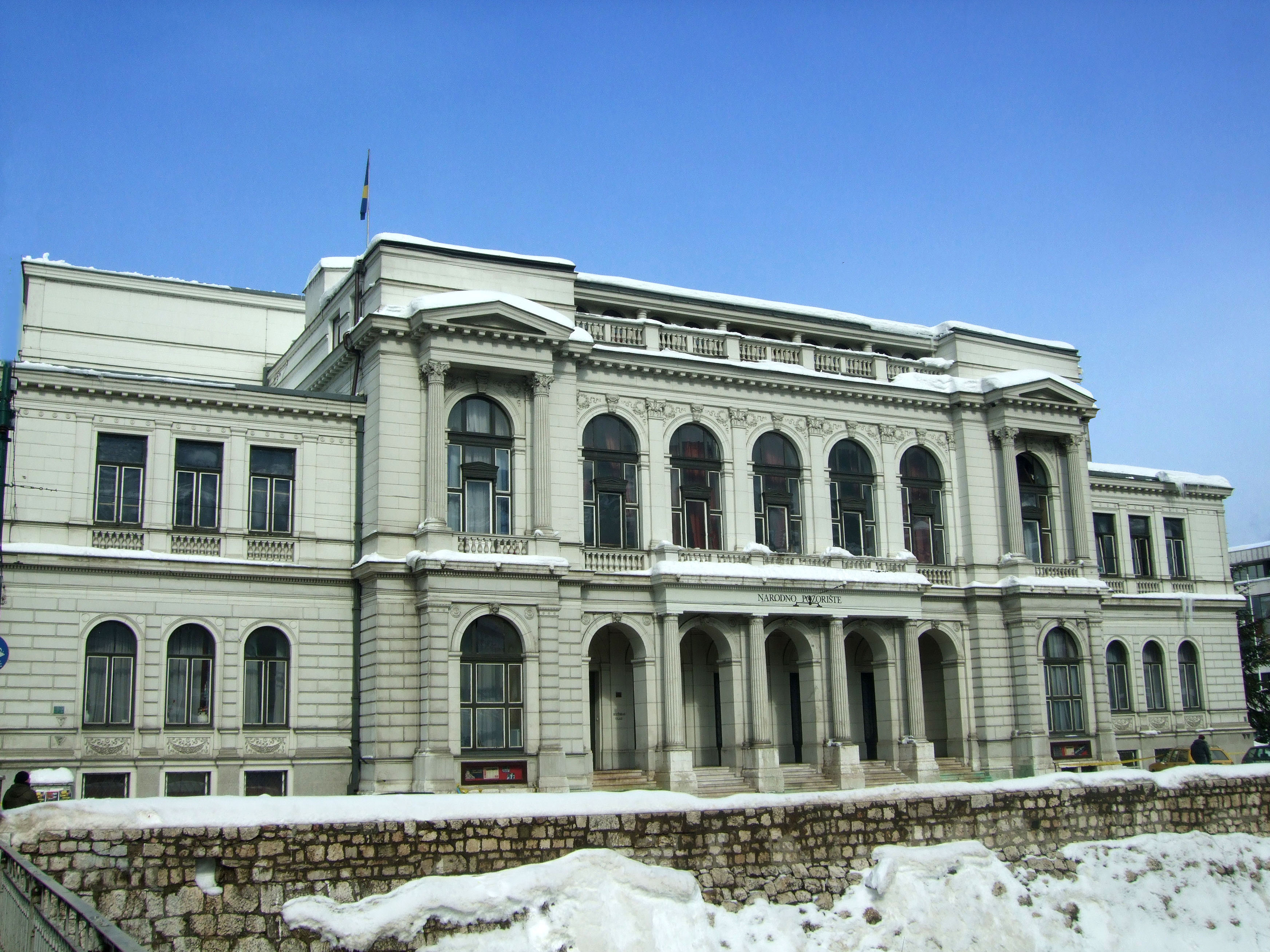
Sarajevo National Theatre (1921)

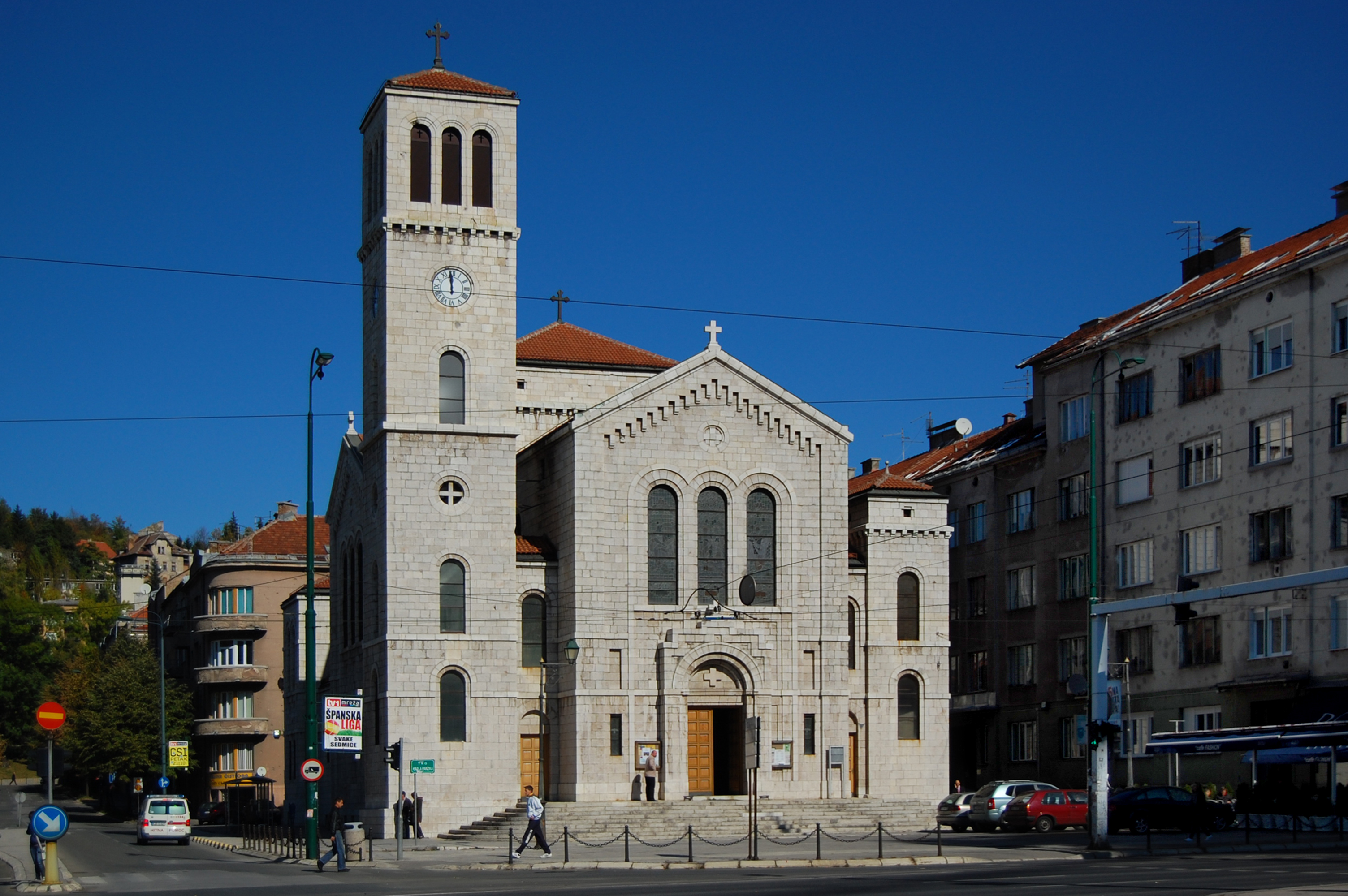
Saint Joseph Catholic Church, Marijin Dvor (1936–1940)

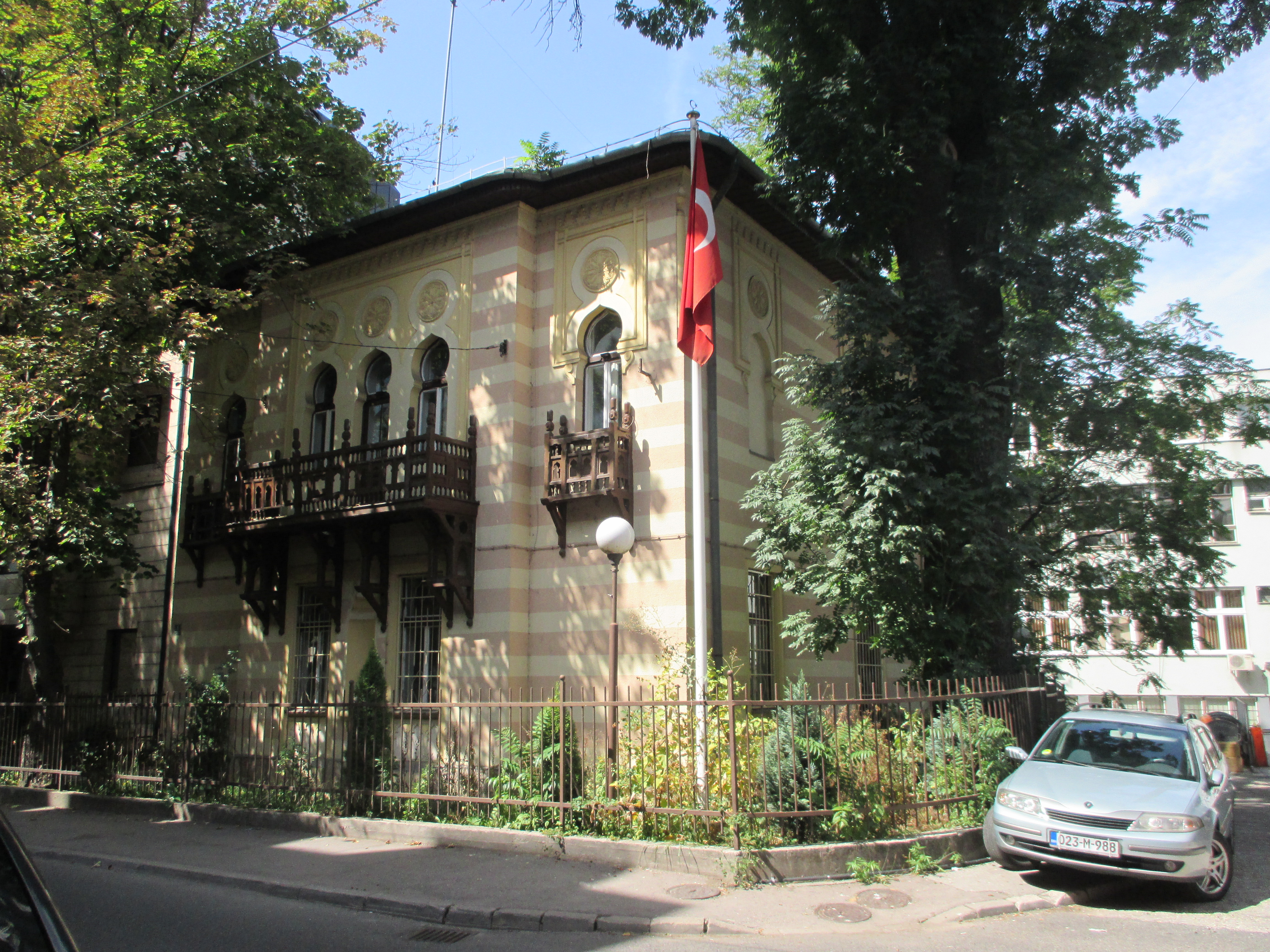
House of Karl Langer (today Embassy of Turkey)

== See also ==
- Architecture of Bosnia and Herzegovina Austro-Hungarian period
- Moorish Revival architecture in Bosnia and Herzegovina
- Architecture of Mostar
- František Blažek
- Josip Vancaš
- Juraj Neidhardt
- Alexander Wittek
