= Moorish Revival architecture in Bosnia and Herzegovina =

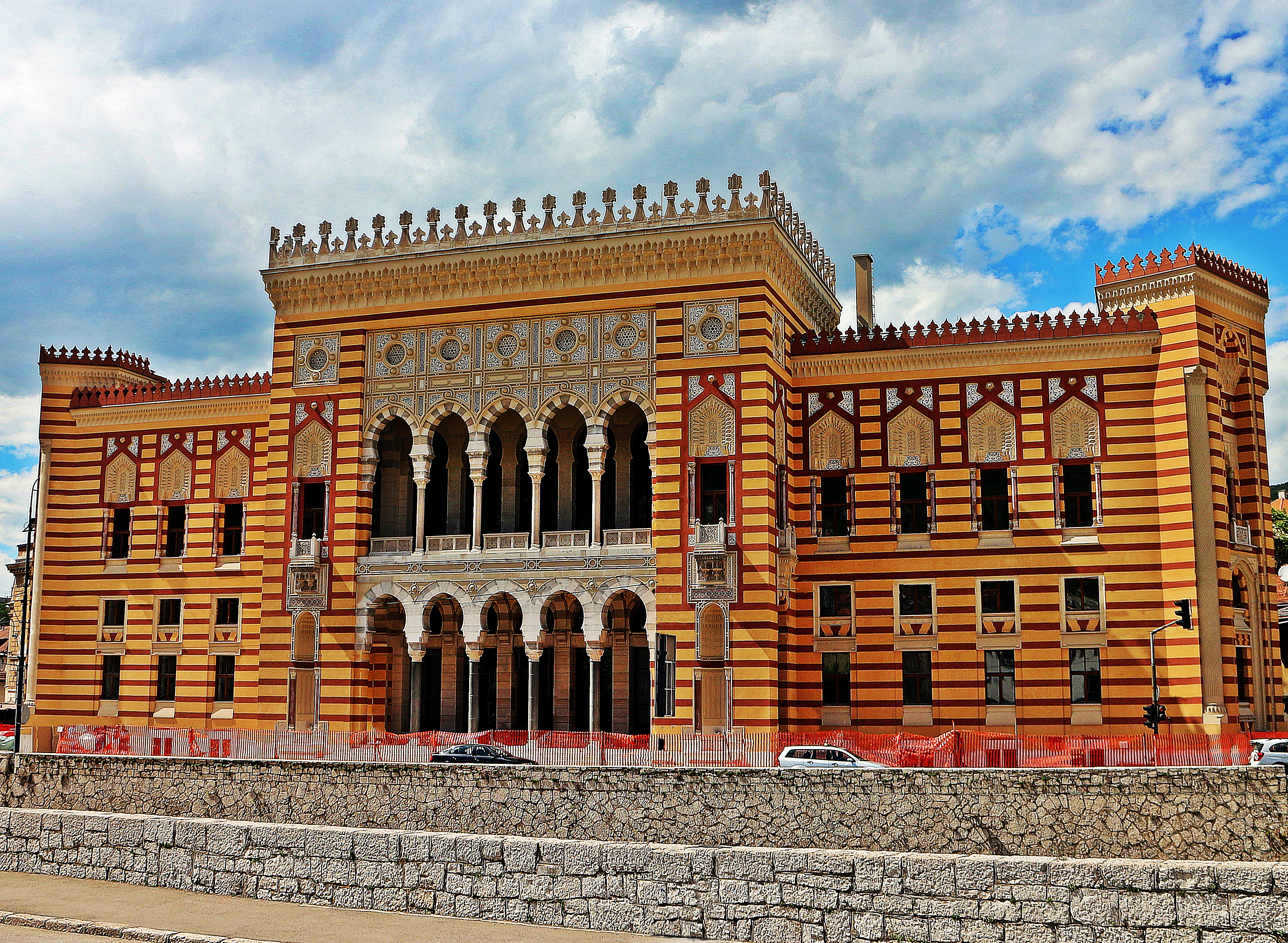
The Vijećnica, built in Moorish Revival style by Karel Pařík, Alexander Wittek and Čiril Iveković (1891–1896)

In 1878 the Austro-Hungarian Empire occupied Bosnia and Herzegovina and in 40 years had an immense influence in future urban planning and architecture. Stylistically, Bosnia was to be assimilated into the European mainstream (hence the use of historicist architectural styles), save for the appearance of the Orientalist style.

Confronted with the multinational population structure in Bosnia and Herzegovina, the government realized that it was necessary to have a political ear when choosing one of the historical styles. For construction in areas where the Bosniak population was predominant, architects used the Moorish Revival style. The aim was to promote Bosnian national identity while avoiding its association with either the Ottoman Empire or the growing pan-Slavic movement by creating an "Islamic architecture of European fantasy".

This style drew its inspiration from the Moorish and Mudéjar architecture of Spain as well as Mamluk architecture of Egypt and Syria, as exemplified by Mostar Gymnasium. This included application of ornamentations and other "Moorish" design strategies, neither of which had much to do with prior architectural direction of indigenous Bosnian architecture. As a reaction, architects influenced by the Art Nouveau movement later developed the Bosnian style in architecture.

== Main buildings ==
- The Vijećnica is the most famous example of Moorish Revival architectural language using decorations and pointed arches while still integrating other formal elements into the design. In 1891, Karel Pařík worked on another major building in the pseudo-Moorish style, the Municipal Hall. Pařík did not want to accept the request of governor Benjamin Kallay to make it very large and therefore Pařík's proposal was rejected. The construction was turned over to Alexander Wittek who was inspired by used the Mosque of Kemal II in Cairo. After Wittek's death the construction was completed under Ćiril Iveković's supervision in 1896. However, the building was built in the style originally conceived by Karel Pařík. During the period of Yugoslavia this building functioned as the National and University Library of Bosnia and Herzegovina. In the Bosnian war of the 1990s the building was destroyed. Its reconstruction was completed in 2014 and now serves as Sarajevo's city hall.
- Ashkenazi Synagogue: during the Austro-Hungarian condominium Sephardic and Ashkenazy communities lived in Sarajevo. The Ashkenazy community came to Sarajevo after 1878 and began constructing a synagogue in 1901. The form of the temple is bejeweled with sharp angled domes over large “drums” and covered with pseudo-Moorish decorations. During the construction changes were made by Pařík and the building was completed in 1902.
- Sharia School (Faculty of Islamic Studies): among Karel Pařík's first projects was the Sarajevo Sharia School. It was constructed in 1887 in a rich Moorish Revival decorative style with elements and details collected from various regional Islamic art schools. The Museum of the City of Sarajevo was opened in the building in 1949 which contained archaeological, historical, ethnographic and art collections. Today this building is used as the Faculty of Islamic Sciences.
- Mostar Gymnasium: the Minister of Finance Béni Kállay took it upon himself to provide the new Mostar gymnasium with a proper building. The first design was offered by the Czech architect Max David in 1897, but Kállay turned it down and gave the project to another Czech architect, František Blažek. The first half of the gymnasium was completed in 1898 and the second in 1902. Featuring Andalusian and Mamluk elements as an example of Moorish Revival architecture, the gymnasium is of historic value and is considered a national monument.
Public buildings
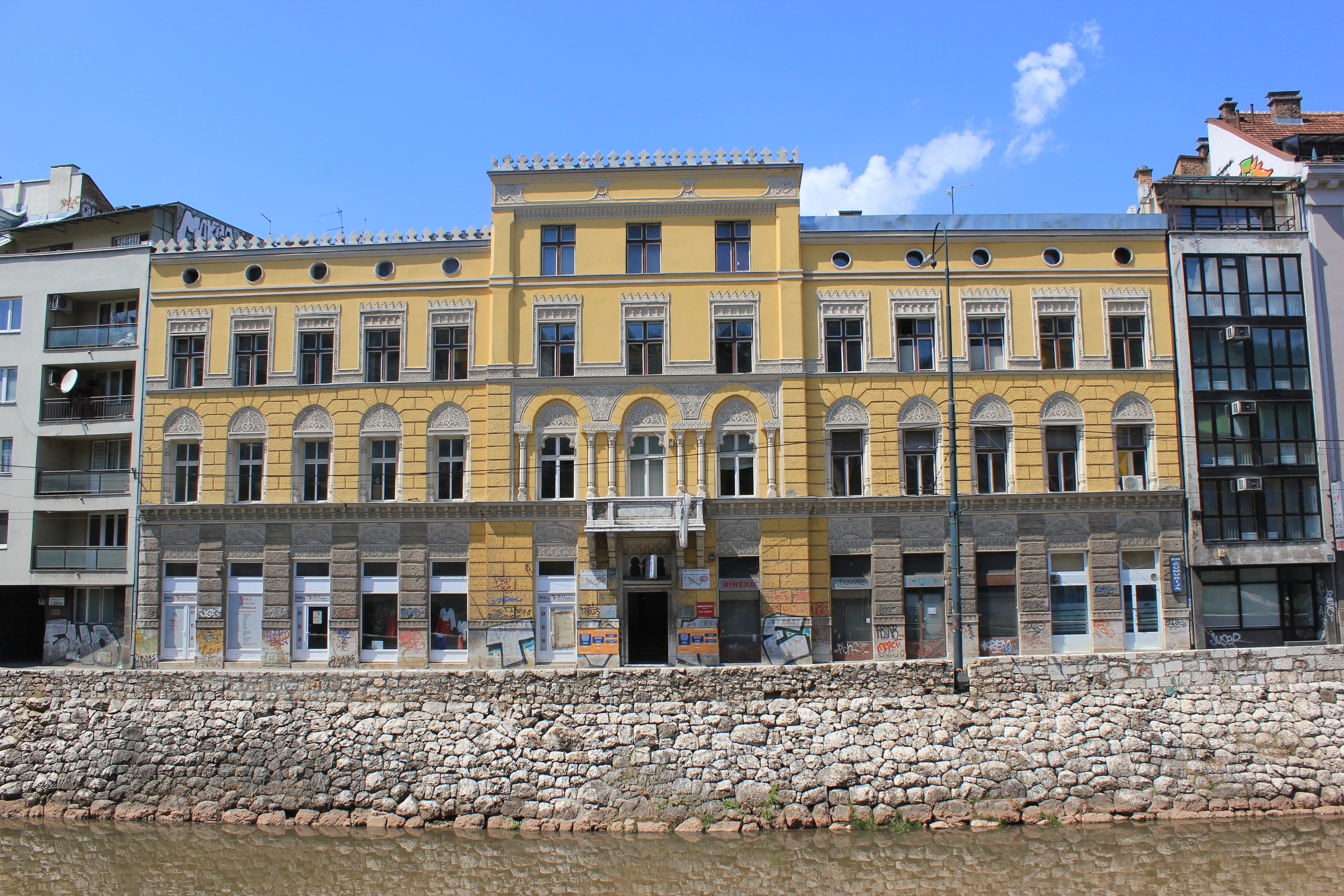
Former police station on obala Kulina bana, Sarajevo

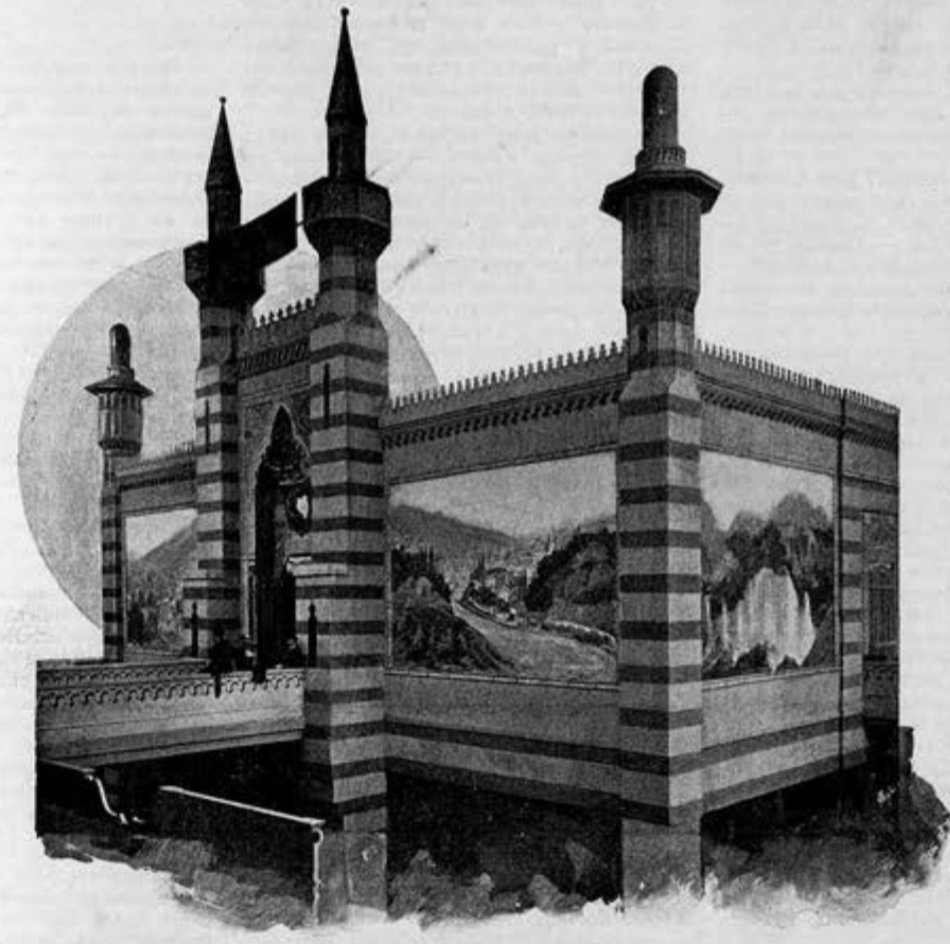
Bosnian pavilion at the 1897 Brussels World Exposition

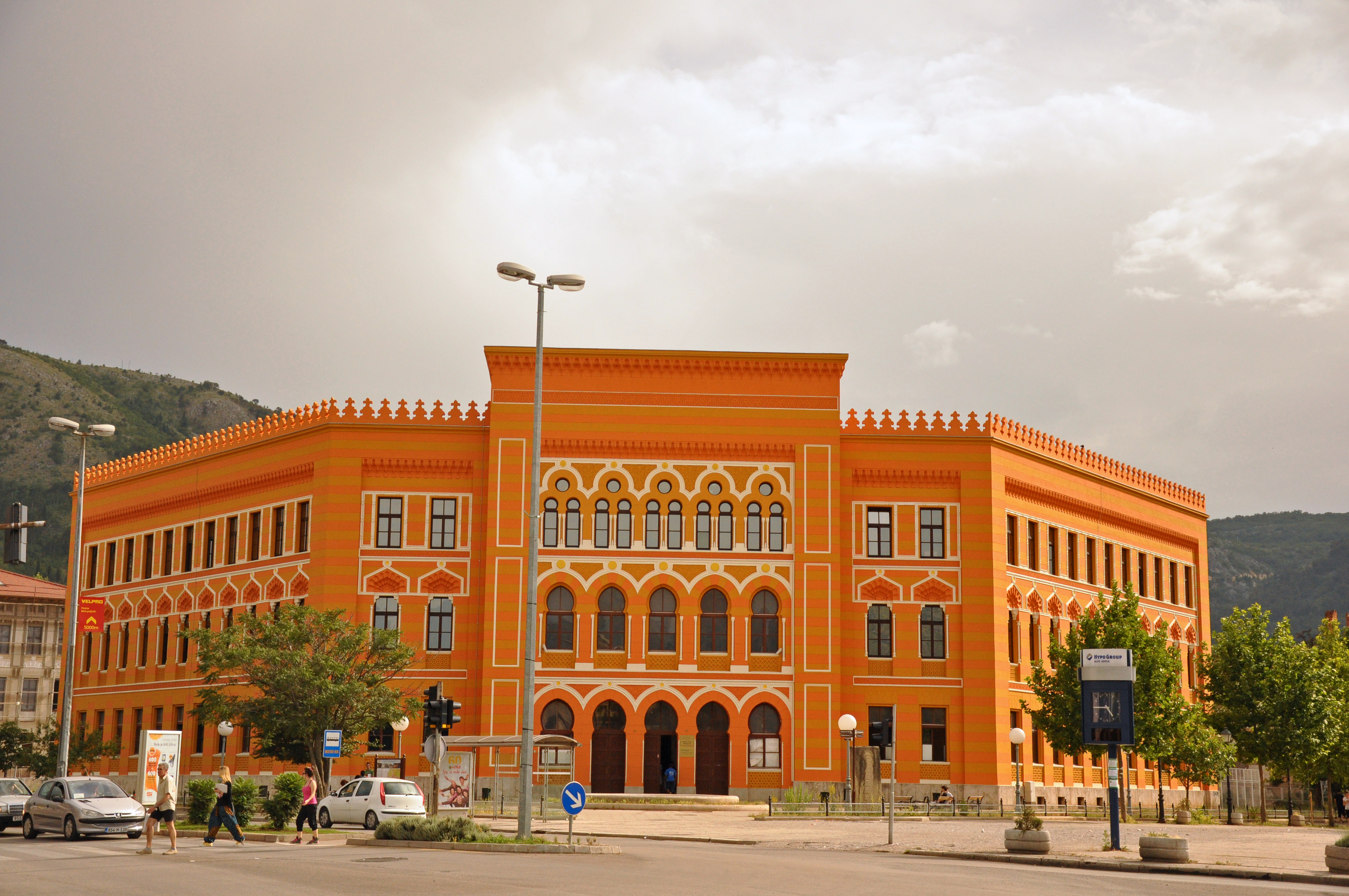
Mostar Gymnasium

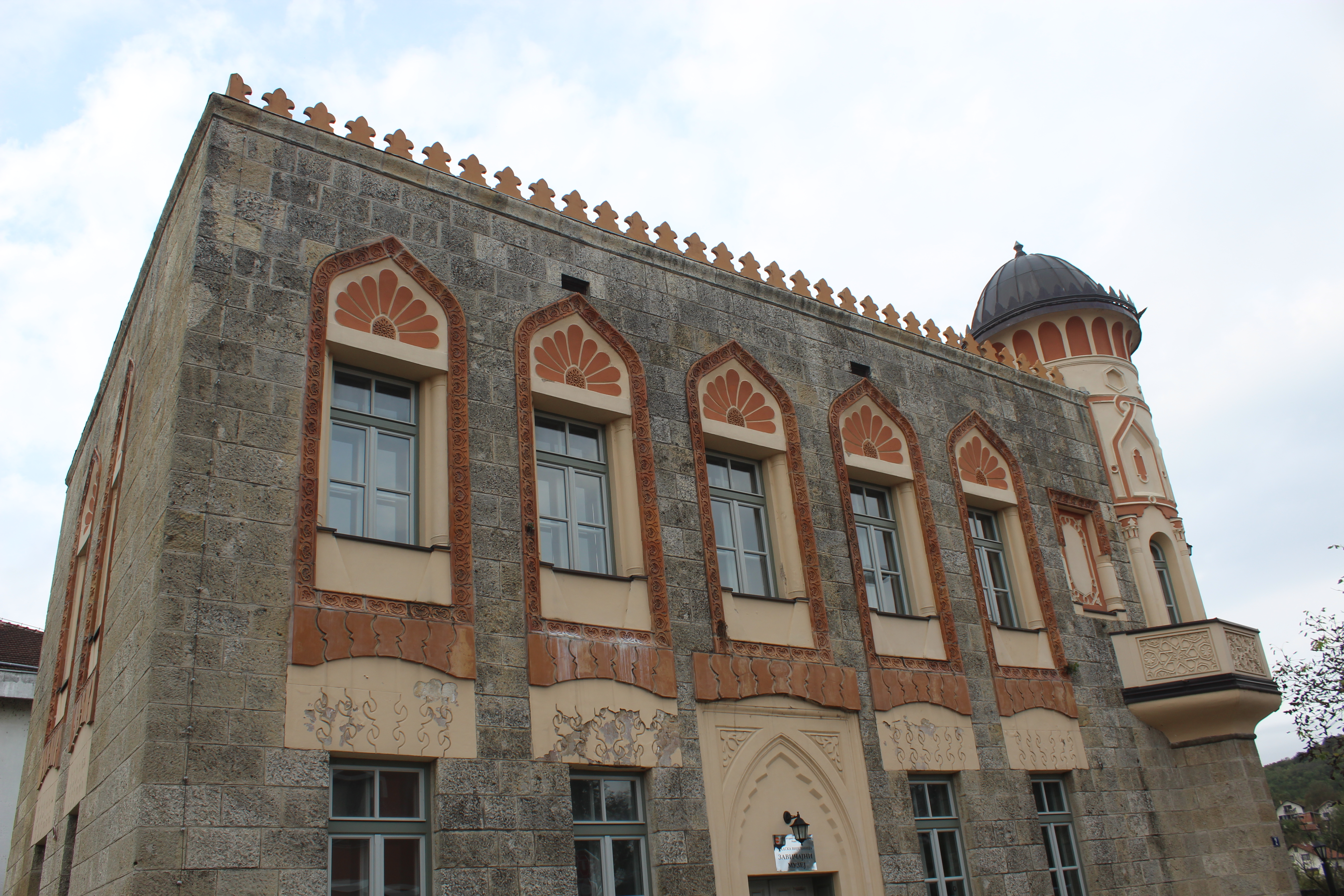
Novi Grad townhall

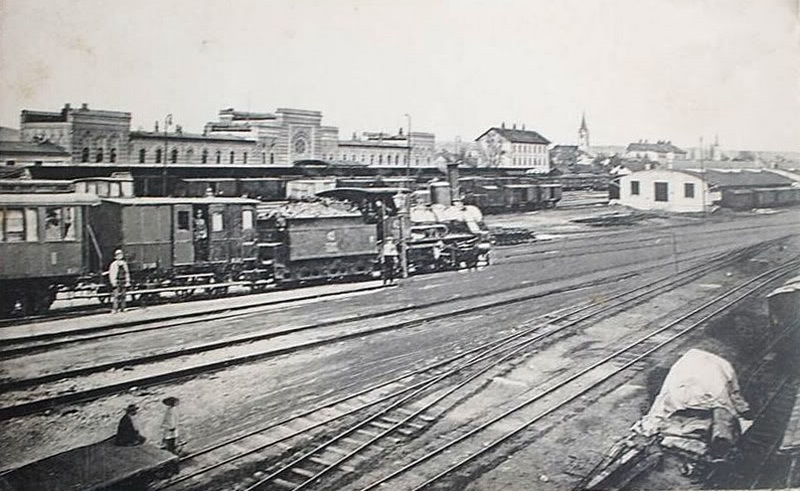
Train station in Bosanski Brod

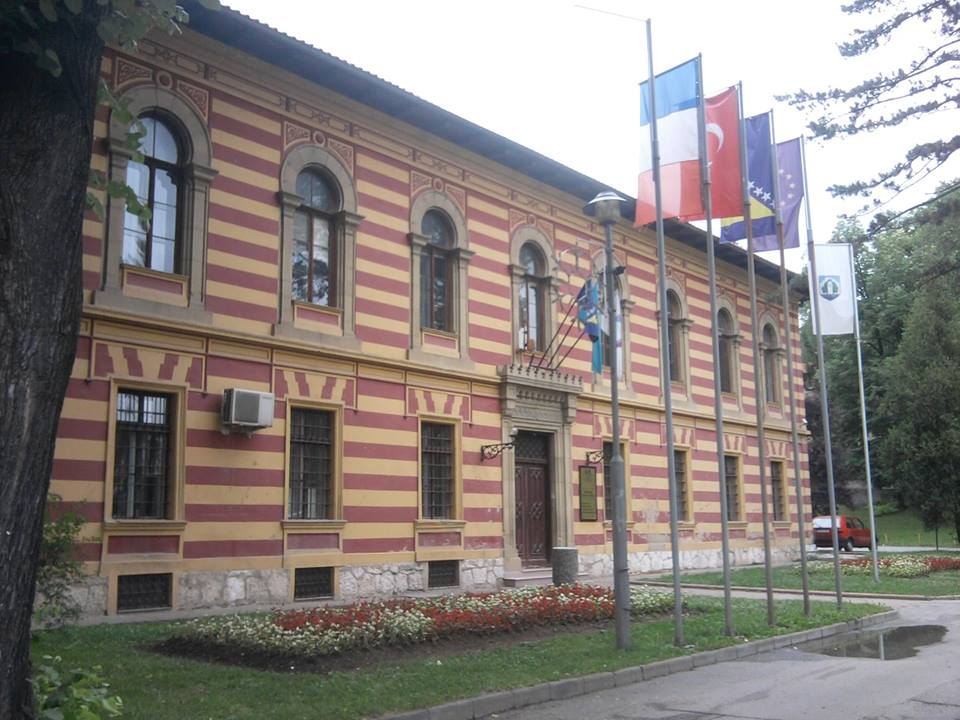
Gračanica town hall

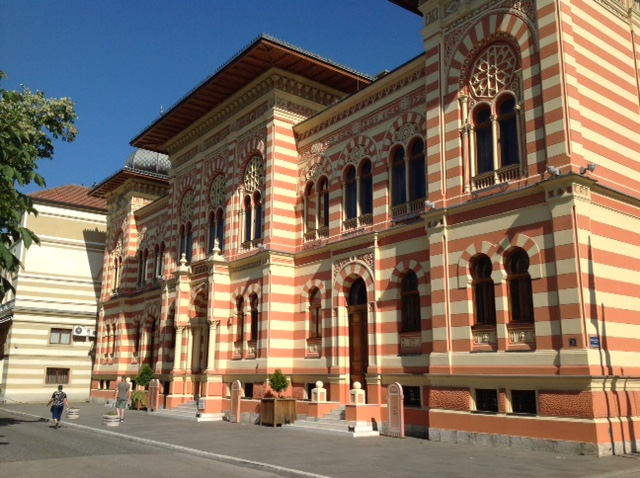
Public library in Brčko

Srebrenica municipality building
Religious buildings
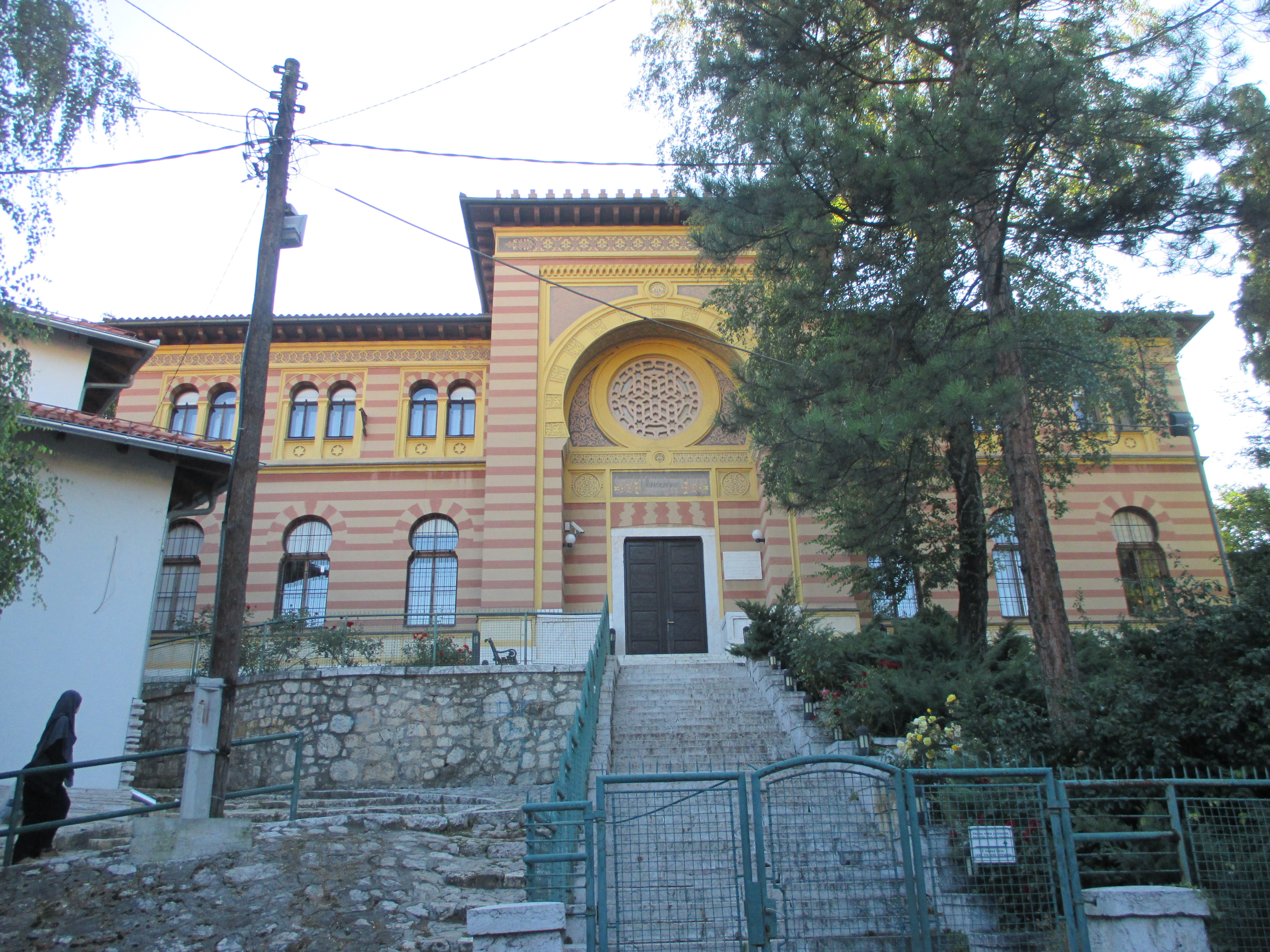
Faculty of Islamic Studies by Karel Pařík (1887)

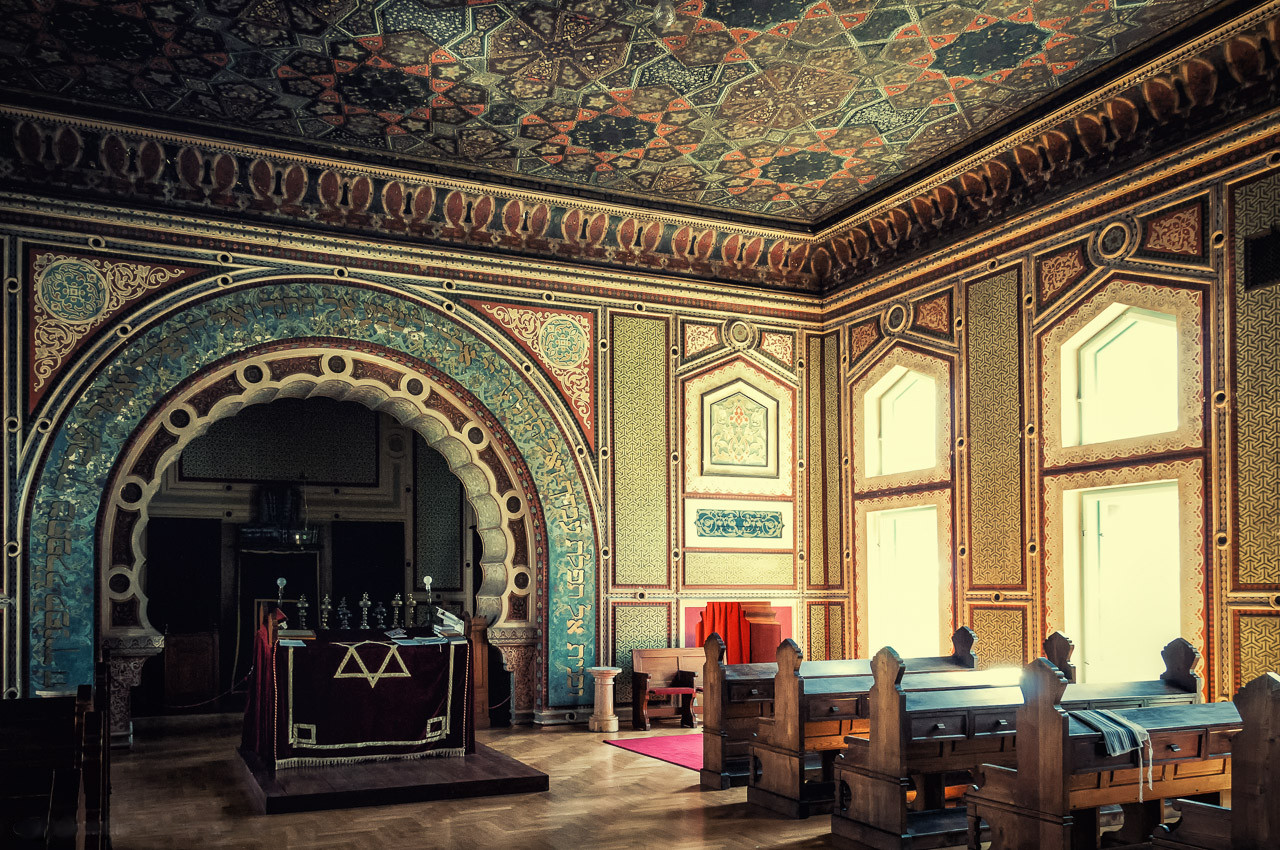
Interior of the Ashkenazi Synagogue by Karel Pařík (1902)

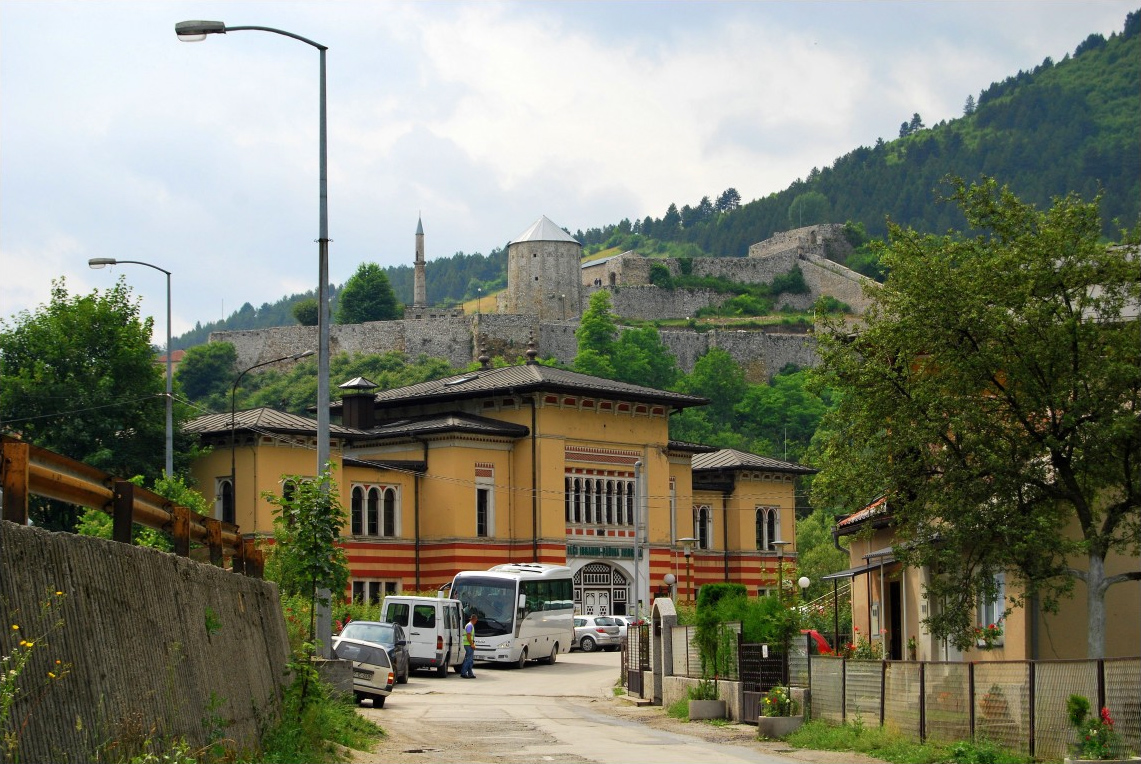
Madrasa of Travnik

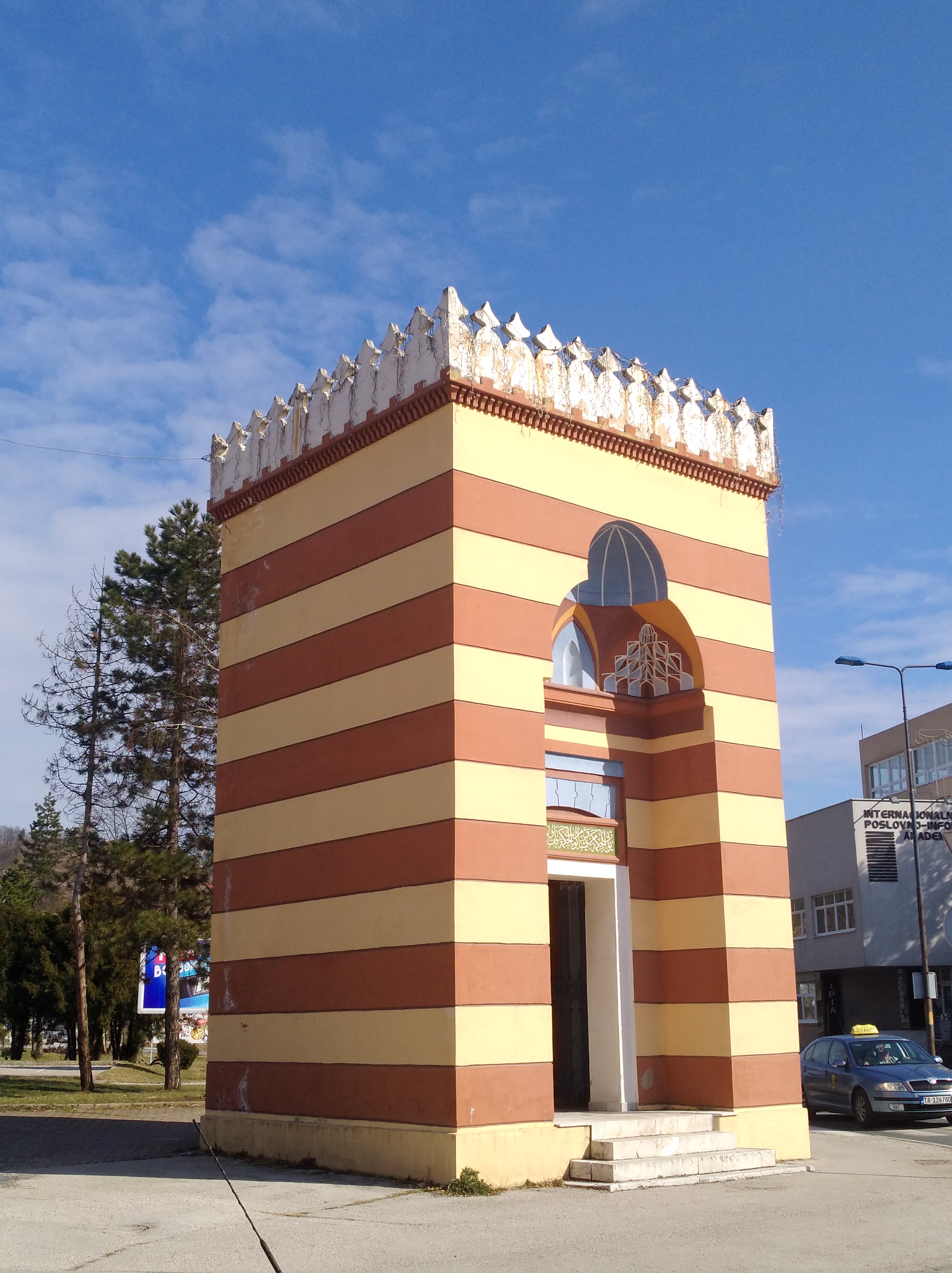
Šarena džamija, Tuzla
Private buildings
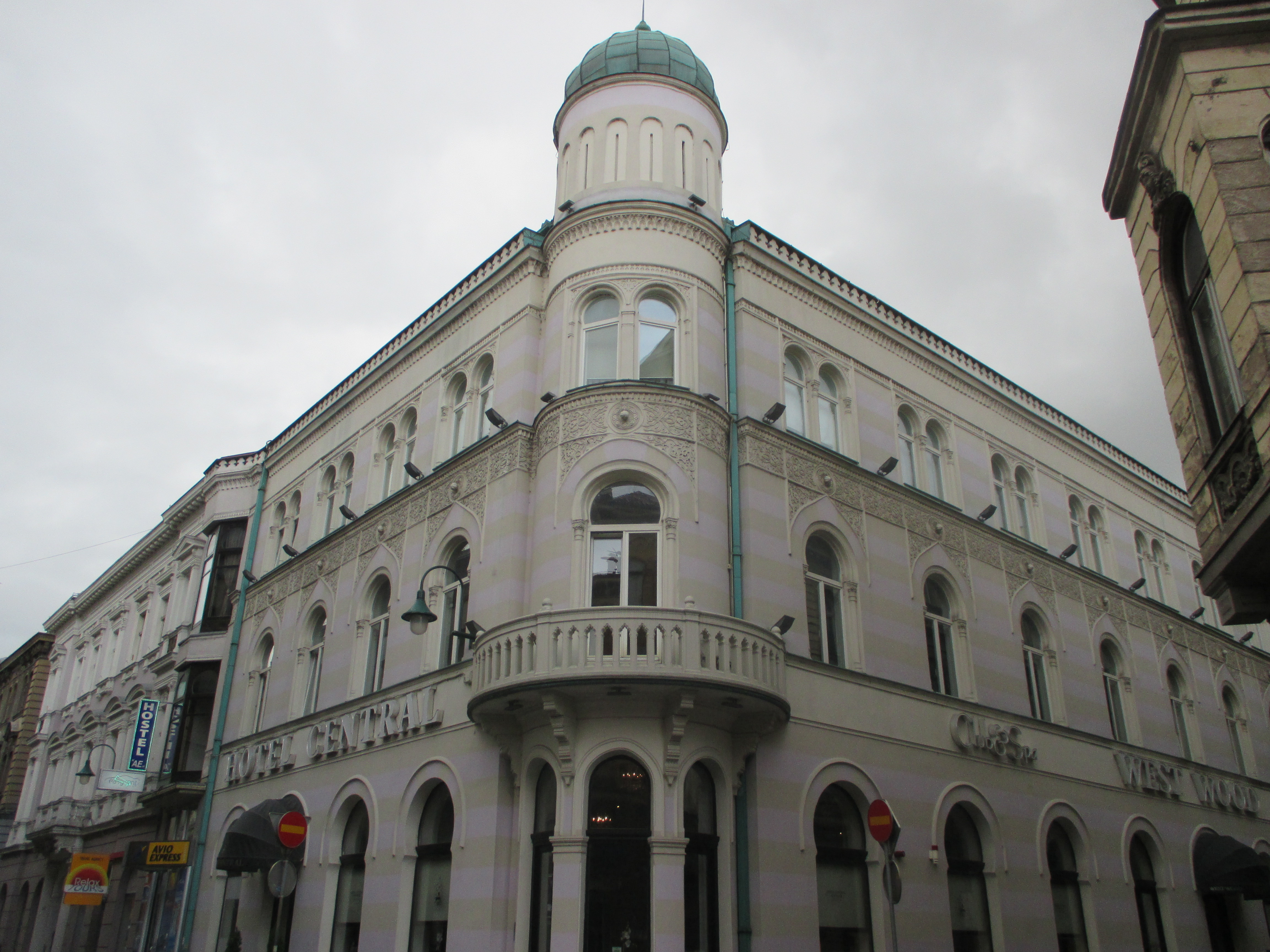
Hotel Central, Sarajevo, by Josip Vancaš (1889)

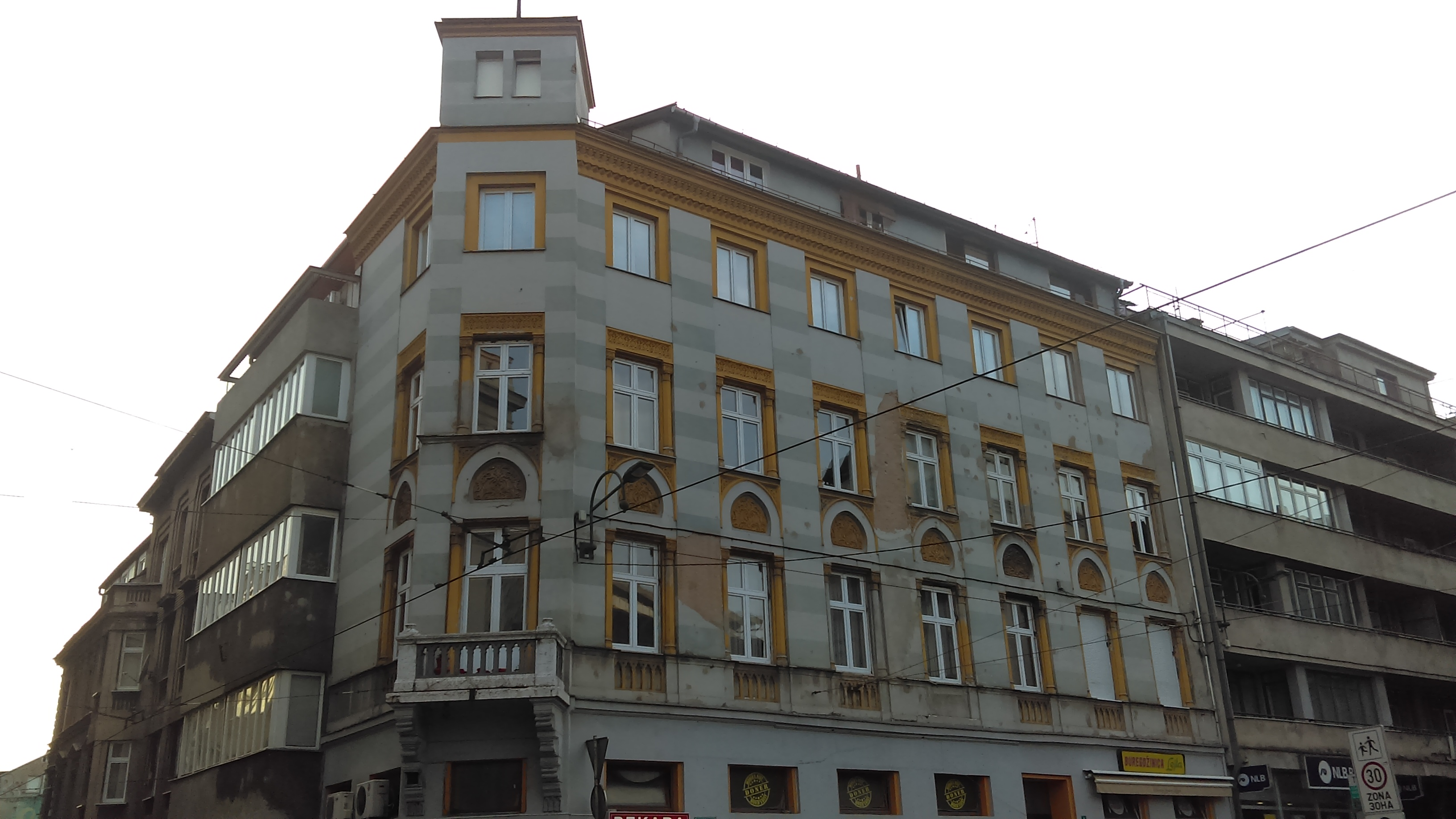
Commercial building "Đenetić", Sarajevo, by Josip Vancaš (1898)

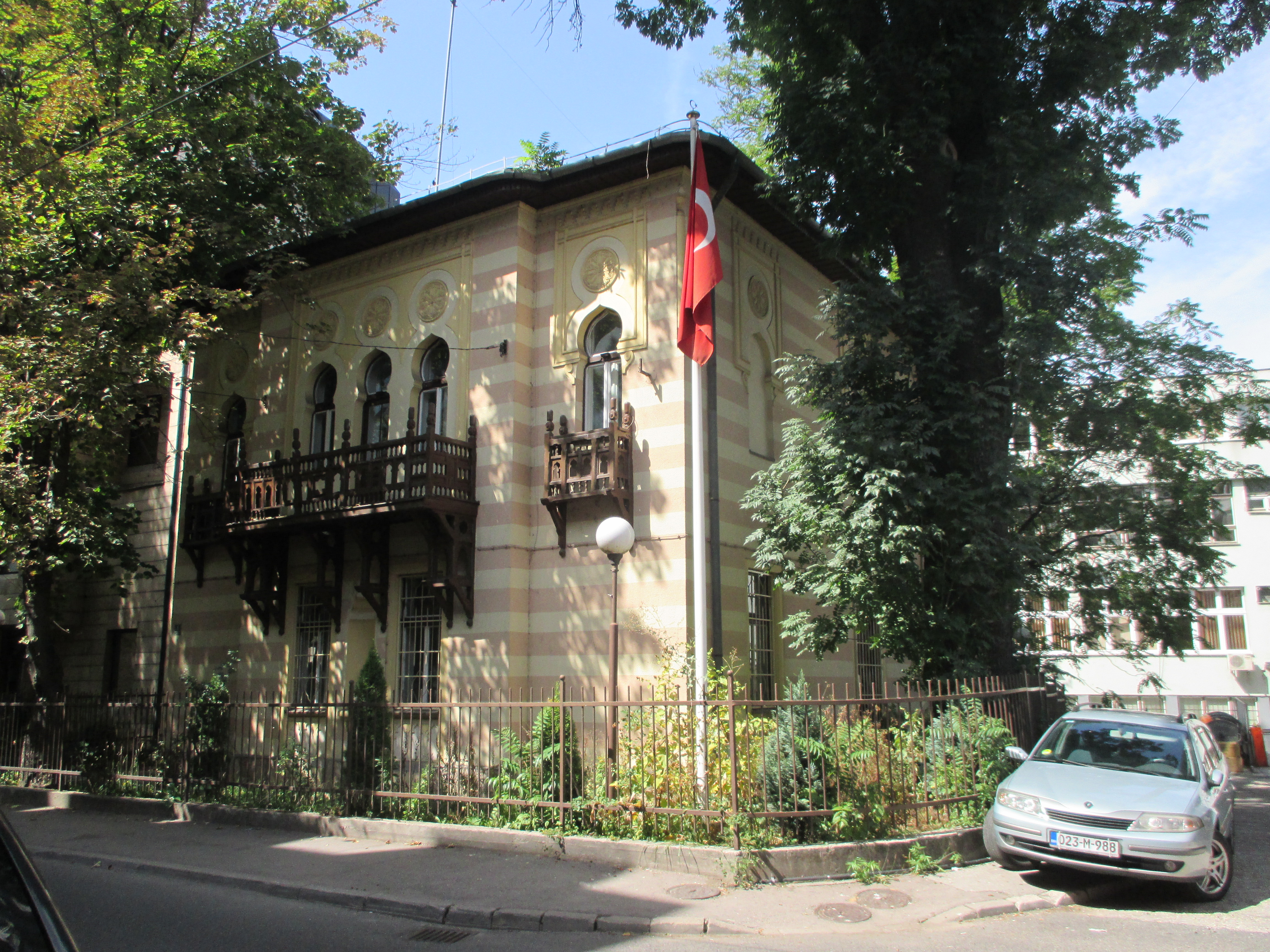
House of Karl Langer (today Embassy of Turkey) by Karel Pařík

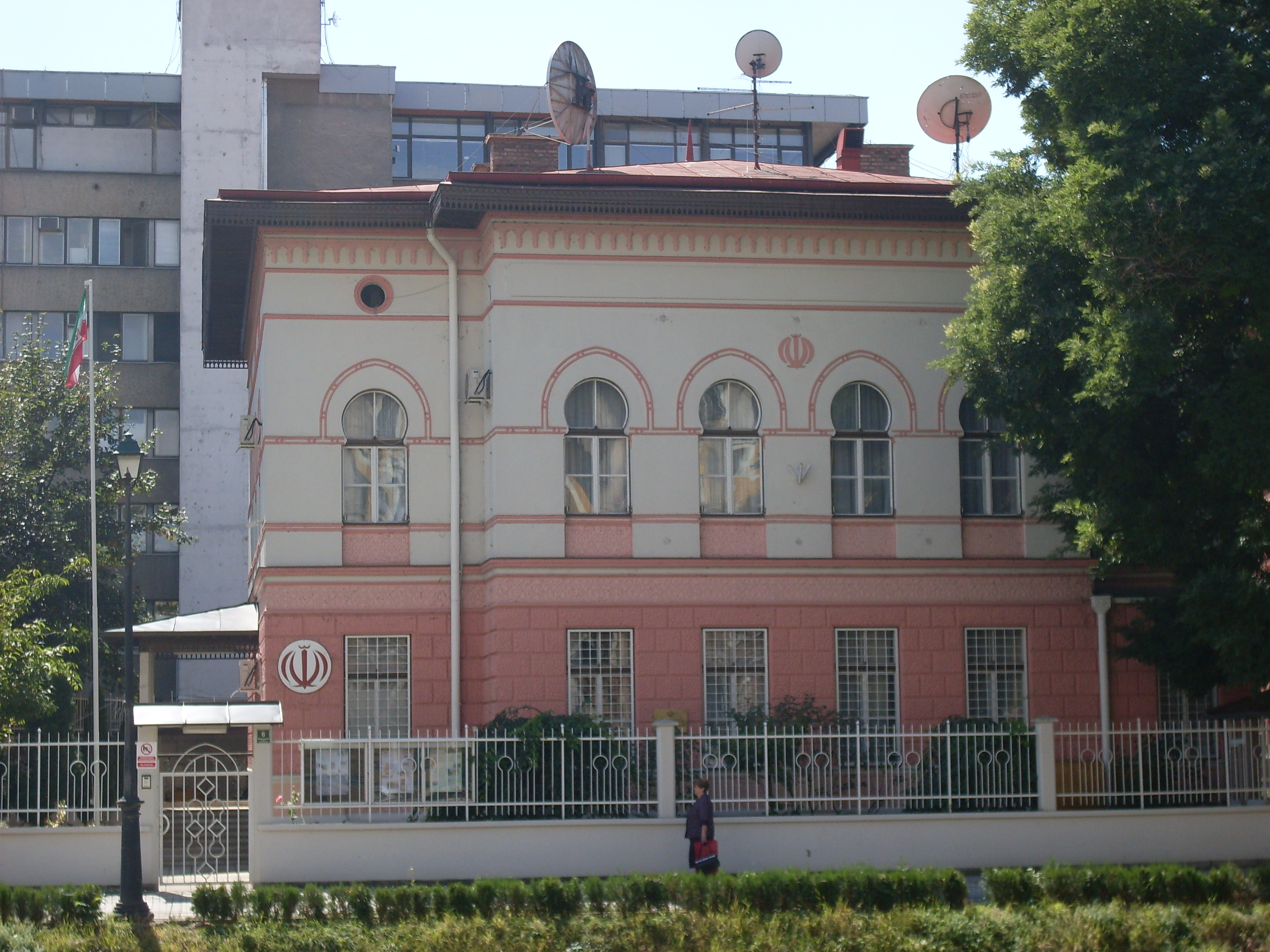
Embassy of Iran, by Hans Niemeczek (1895)

== See also ==
- Architecture of Bosnia and Herzegovina
- Moorish Revival architecture
