= Veliš (Jičín District) =

- Municipality
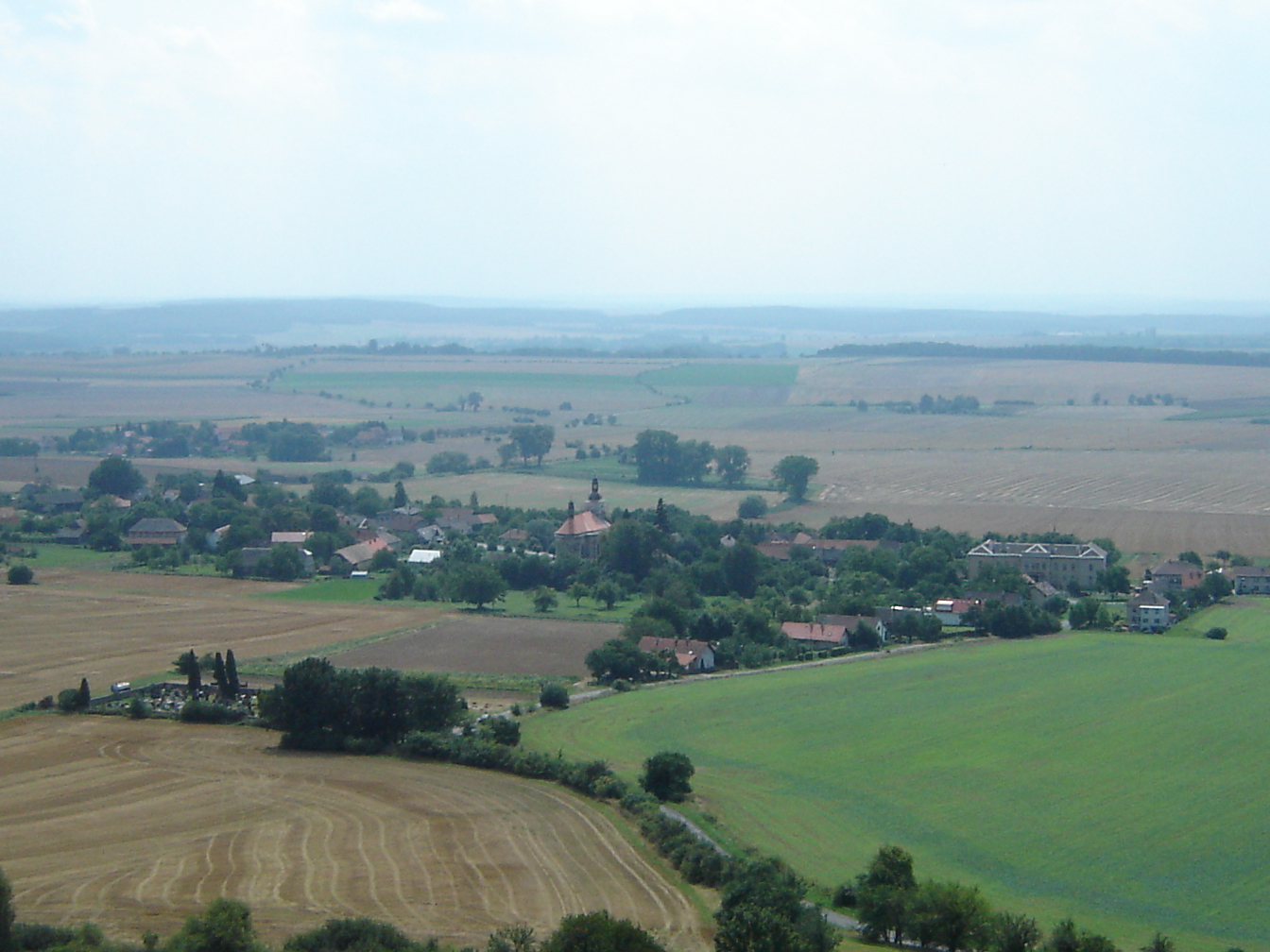
- Veliš seen from the ruins of the Veliš Castle

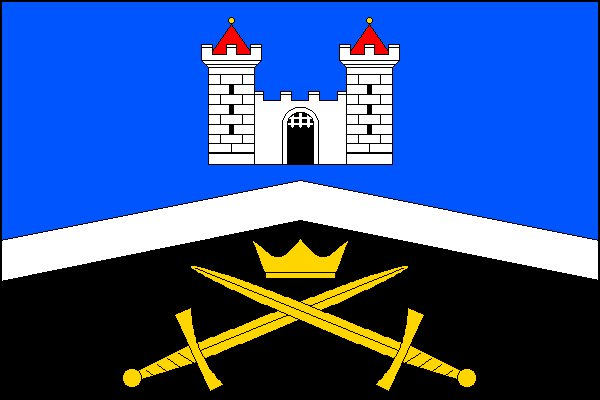
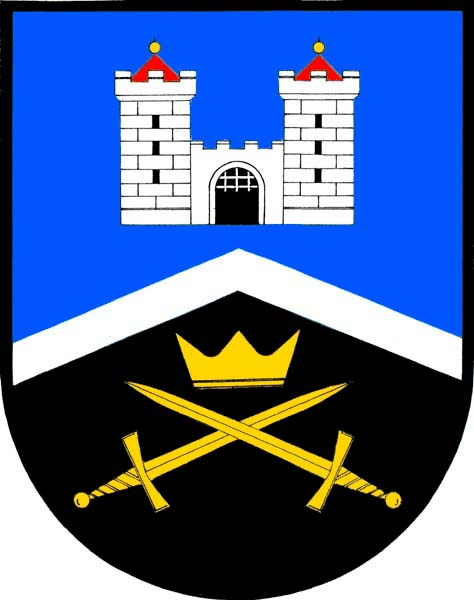
- Flag Coat of arms

- Location in the Czech Republic
- Coordinates: 50°24′27″N 15°19′4″E
- Country: Czech Republic
- Region: Hradec Králové
- District: Jičín
- First mentioned: 1143

Area
  - Total: 5.13 km^{2} (1.98 sq mi)
- Elevation: 322 m (1,056 ft)

Population (2026-01-01)
  - Total: 197
  - Density: 38.4/km^{2} (99.5/sq mi)
- Time zone: UTC+1 (CET)
  - Summer (DST): UTC+2 (CEST)
- Postal code: 507 21
- Website: www.velis.cz

Veliš is a municipality and village in Jičín District in the Hradec Králové Region of the Czech Republic. It has about 200 inhabitants.

== Administrative division ==
Veliš consists of two municipal parts (in brackets population according to the 2021 census):

- Veliš (138)
- Vesec (55)

== Demographics ==
Historical population
Year	Pop.	±%
1869	402	—
1880	377	−6.2%
1890	403	+6.9%
1900	413	+2.5%
1910	413	+0.0%
1921	412	−0.2%
1930	369	−10.4%
1950	244	−33.9%
1961	248	+1.6%
1970	211	−14.9%
1980	146	−30.8%
1991	136	−6.8%
2001	129	−5.1%
2011	164	+27.1%
2021	193	+17.7%
Source: Censuses

== Notable people ==
- Karel Pařík (1857–1942), architect
