= Eskenazi =

Eskenazi is a variant of the surname Ashkenazi (surname) reflecting a Sephardic pronunciation. It may refer to:

== People ==
- Anthony Eskenzi, British politician
- Giuseppe Eskenazi (born 1939), London oriental art dealer
- Jason Eskenazi (born 1960), American photographer
- Roza Eskenazi (1890s–1980), Greek singer
- Sergio Esquenazi (born 1974), Argentinian filmmaker
- Stephen Eskinazi (born 1994), British cricketer
- Tamara Cohn Eskenazi, American scholar and rabbi

== Other ==
- Eskenazi (art gallery), London
- Eskenazi Museum of Art, Bloomington, Indiana, U.S.
- Sidney & Lois Eskenazi Hospital, Indianapolis, Indiana, U.S.
  - Eskenazi Health Art Collection
