= Benjamin Ashkenazi =

Russian communal worker and philanthropist (1824–1894)

Benjamin Ashkenazi (1824–1894) was a Polish Jewish communal worker and philanthropist in 19th-century Russian Empire.

== Life ==
Ashkenazi was born in 1824 to Joshua Heschel Ashkenazi, rabbi of Lublin, a descendant of Rabbi Tzvi Ashkenazi.

Benjamin Ashkenazi settled at Grodno, where he became the leading spirit in communal affairs. A hospital was built on his initiative, and later, a home for the aged. The government, in recognition of his services, bestowed upon him and his children hereditary honorary citizenship. In 1882, Ashkenazi was sent as delegate to the rabbinical convention at St. Petersburg; and in 1883, he was one of the few Jewish representatives who attended officially the coronation of Alexander III at Moscow. In 1884, he was appointed chairman of the committee on prisons of the government of Grodno.

Ashkenazi died at Grodno in 1894.
