= Meir Ashkenazi (merchant) =

Meir Ashkenazi was a sixteenth-century Crimean Jew.

An envoy of the Khan of Crimea in the sixteenth century, Ashkenazi was killed by pirates on a voyage from Gava (near Genoa) to Dakhel (probably Dakhel or Dakleh in the western oasis of Upper Egypt), between the 15th and the 25th day of Tammuz (July), 1567. From the testimony of the witness Elias ben Nehemiah, given before the board of rabbis in Safed in the case of the widow and heirs of the slain Meïr Ashkenazi, it was made evident that he was an inhabitant of Kefe; that his parents were still living there; that he had a brother who was a student in the yeshiva of Brest-Litovsk; that he had brought to Gava prisoners of war from Egypt; that he was appointed envoy of the khan of the Tatars to the king of Poland; and that on the way from Gava to Dakhel he was slain by pirates with all the passengers on the ship.
