= Moses David Ashkenazi =

Galician-born rabbi and Talmudist (died 1856)

Moses David Ashkenazi (Hebrew: משה דוד אשכנזי; c. 1773–74 – July 21, 1856) was a Talmudist and author. He was born in Galicia in the 1770s. After holding the office of rabbi at Tolcsva, Hungary, from 1803 to 1843, he immigrated to Palestine, initially staying in Jerusalem for four months. At the direction of Yisrael Friedman of Ruzhin, he then settled permanently in Safed, where he became a rabbi of the Ashkenazi community. He helped rebuild the Hassidic community in Safed after the 1837 Galilee earthquake. Ashkenazi died in Safed on July 21, 1856 and is buried in the city's Old Jewish Cemetery.

== Works ==
In 1844 he published in Jerusalem his chief work, "Toledot Adam" (Generations of Adam; "ADM" being the initial letters of his name), containing novellae on several treatises of the Babylonian Talmud and two decisions on complicated halakhic questions. "Toledot Adam" is prefaced with an approbation by Jacob of Lissa, and with another by Jacob Orenstein. Both of these eminent Talmudists regarded Ashkenazi as their peer; Orenstein speaks of him as "schoolmate."

Ashkenazi's second work, "Beer Sheba" (Well of the Oath), is a collection of homiletic disquisitions on the Tanakh (Jerusalem, 1852). In the preface he says that he had been in the Holy Land for nine years. An approbation to it was written by Abulafia, Hakam Bashi of Jerusalem.

== Family ==
Ashkenazi's father, Asher Anschel, was a prominent Talmudist. Moses had six children; several were rabbis in Galicia, including Joel and Solomon. Joel, who left no work, is quoted in "Toledot Adam", while Solomon wrote a book entitled "Kotnot Or" (Garments of Light). Solomon moved to Palestine and died in Jerusalem in February of 1862.
