= Ćiril Iveković =

Croatian architect and conservator (1864 –1933)

Ćiril Metod Iveković
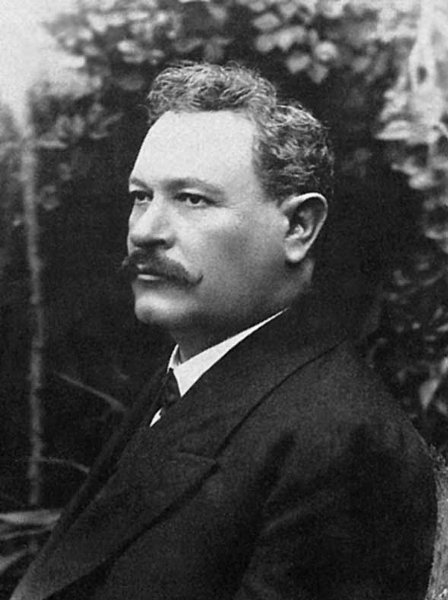
- Born: November 1, 1864; Klanjec, Kingdom of Croatia, Austrian Empire (now Klanjec, Croatia)
- Died: May 15, 1933 (aged 68); Zagreb, Kingdom of Yugoslavia (now Zagreb, Croatia)
- Occupations: architect, conservator

Ćiril Metod Iveković (Croatian pronunciation: [t͡ɕǐril mětoːd iʋěːkoʋit͡ɕ] or [t͡ɕǐril metôːd iʋěːkoʋit͡ɕ]; 1 November 1864 – 15 May 1933) was a Croatian architect and conservator.

== Biography ==
He was the first of eleven children born to a municipal notary. His younger brother, Oton, was a well known painter. His uncle, Dr. Franjo Iveković, and cousin, Dr. Ivan Broz were the creators of the first full Croatian dictionary. After completing his secondary education in Varaždin and Zagreb, his uncle's support enabled him to study at the Polytechnic Institute in Vienna.

In 1884, under the supervision of Hermann Bollé, Iveković performed stonework for the restoration of Zagreb Cathedral and, the following year, taught stonemasonry at the School of Arts and Crafts in Zagreb. In 1886, without any financial support, he went on foot back to Vienna and enrolled at the Academy of Fine Arts, where he studied until 1889. In 1888, the Academy awarded him its Gundel-Prize for excellence.

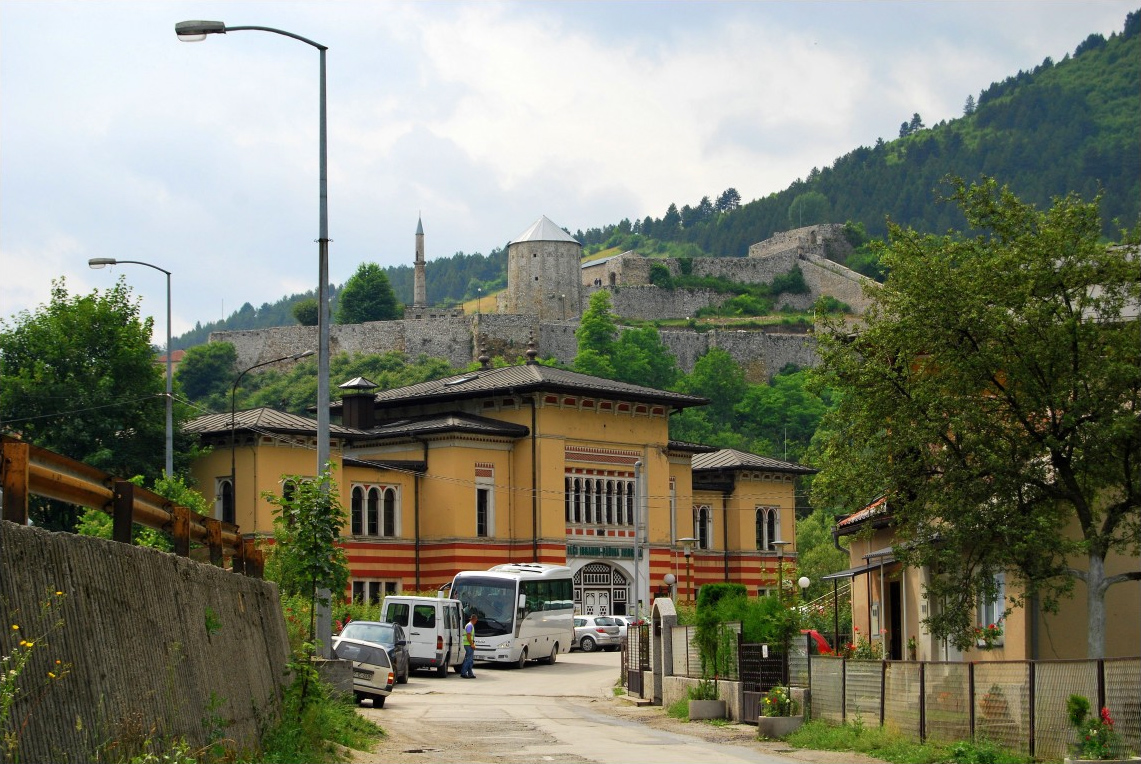
The Madrasa in Travnik which Iveković designed.

During his studies, Iveković worked with the architectural firm of Fellner & Helmer, which specialized in designing theatres. The year following his graduation, he travelled to Italy, then worked in the studios of Baron Karl von Hasenauer, making detailed architectural drawings of historical buildings. With the Baron's recommendation, he became an architect for the provincial government in Sarajevo. He was there for six years and worked on his most familiar project; completing the Vijećnica (City Hall), left unfinished by the death of Alexander Wittek. He also built a city hall for Brčko and a madrasa in Travnik.

In 1896, he was appointed as architect in charge of religious buildings for the Dalmatian government in Zadar. Upon arriving, he travelled throughout the region, assessing the state of its structures. This included archaeological examinations at the Roman site of Asseria, near Benkovac. One of his first projects involved repairing damage to the bell tower at Zadar Cathedral. Major restoration projects were completed under his direction at the Church of St. Donatus and the Church of St. Chrysogonus. He spent almost twenty-five years there, working as an architect, conservator, archaeologist, restorer and, finally, as a photographer. Altogether, he created approximately forty buildings, sacred and profane, throughout Dalmatia.

Iveković remained active in Vienna, becoming a corresponding member of the "Central Commission for the Study and Maintenance of Historical and Artistic Monuments" in 1899 and, later, the Austrian Archaeological Institute. He was also a member of the "Bihać Organization", an historical preservation society founded by the priest Frane Bulić.

The city of Zadar came under Italian rule at the end World War I, but Iveković held on to his position until 1920 when he moved to Zagreb and became a professor of architecture at the Technical High School. From 1922 he was a member of the Croatian Academy of Sciences and Arts. He died suddenly, while preparing to go on an archaeological excavation in Biograd.
