= Béni Kállay =

Hungarian statesman and nobleman (1839–1903)

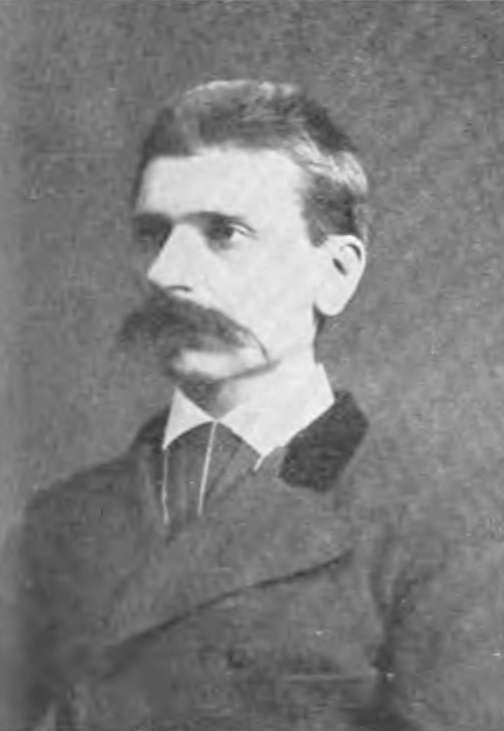
Béni Kállay

Béni Kállay de Nagy-Kálló or Benjamin von Kállay (Hungarian: Kállay Benjámin; 22 December 1839 – 13 July 1903) was an Austro-Hungarian (Habsburg) statesman and a Hungarian nobleman.

== Early life ==
Kállay was born in Pest (today part of Budapest). His family derived their name from their estates at Nagykálló, in Szabolcs, and claimed descent from the gens (clan) Balogsemjén, which had settled the area of the historical Borsod County, Szabolcs County, and Szatmár County in the late 9th century. His family belonged to an old, untitled Hungarian nobility. They played a prominent part in Hungarian history as early as the reign of King Coloman (1070–1116); and from King Matthias Corvinus (1458–1490) they received their estates at Mezőtúr, near Kecskemét, granted to Mihály Kállay for his heroic defense of Jajce in Bosnia.

Stephan von Kállay, Benjamin's father, a superior official of the Hungarian government, died in 1845, and his widow, who survived until 1902, devoted herself to the education of her five-year-old son. Amalie von Kállay née Blašković de Ebetske, was of Serbian descent. She took over the care of Kállay's education and directed his interest to Slavic studies in general and particularly to Serbian history. She spoke Serbian and it is very likely that her son heard some of her reminiscences relating to the country of her ancestors. She engaged an excellent teacher in the person of Mihály Táncsics, a well-known populist tribune and revolutionary writer of Serb and Slovak descent, who was once imprisoned by the Austrians for seditious writings in 1847–48 and again in 1860 (the same Buda jail that Lajos Kossuth was incarcerated from 1837 to 1840). At an early age Kállay manifested a deep interest in politics, and especially in the Eastern Question. He traveled in Russia, European Turkey and Asia Minor, gaining a thorough knowledge of Greek, Turkish, and several Slavic languages. He became as proficient in Serbian as in his native tongue.

== Career ==
In 1867 he entered the Diet of Hungary as Conservative deputy for Mühlbach (Szászsebes); in 1869 he was appointed consul-general at Belgrade, and in 1872 he visited the Vilayet of Bosnia for the first time. His views on Balkan questions strongly influenced Count Andrássy, the Austro-Hungarian minister for foreign affairs. Leaving Belgrade in 1875, he resumed his seat in the Diet, and shortly afterward founded the journal Kelet Népe, or People of the East, in which he defended the vigorous policy of Andrássy.

After the Russo-Turkish War of 1878 he went to Plovdiv (modern Bulgaria) as Austro-Hungarian envoy extraordinary on the International Eastern Rumelian Commission. In 1879, he became second, and soon afterward first, departmental chief at the foreign office in Vienna. On 4 June 1882, he was appointed Austro-Hungarian minister of finance and administrator of the Condominium of Bosnia and Herzegovina, and the distinction with which he filled this office, for a period of 21 years, is his chief title of fame.

Kállay was an honorary member of the Budapest and Vienna academies of science, and attained some eminence as a writer. He translated John Stuart Mill's On Liberty into Hungarian, adding an introductory critique; while his version of Galatea, a play by the Greek dramatist Spiridion N. Basiliades (1843–1874), proved successful on the Hungarian stage. His monographs on Serbian history (Geschichte der Serben) was translated into Serbo-Croatian by Gavrilo Vitković, and on the Oriental ambition of Russia (Die Orientpolitik Russlands) was translated into German by J. H. Schwicker and published at Leipzig in 1878. But in his own opinion, his masterpiece was an academic oration on the political and geographical position of Hungary as a link between East and West.

== Personal life ==
In 1873, Kállay married the Countess Vilma Bethlen de Bethlen (1850–1940). They had three surviving daughters and a son:

- Márta Kállay de Nagy-Kálló (1875–1891)
- Frigyes Kállay de Nagy-Kálló (1877–1944) ⚭ Baroness Elisabeth Aloysia Klementina Vay de Vaya (1877–1922); had issue ⚭ Amalia Maria Köver de Gyergyószentmiklós (b. 1880)
  - Ilona Kállay de Nagy-Kálló (d. 1908)
  - György Kállay de Nagy-Kálló (1902–1968) ⚭ Charlotte Várady de Várad (1900–1970); had issue:
    - István Kállay de Nagy-Kálló (b. 1935)
  - László Kállay de Nagy-Kálló (d. 1928)
- Erzsébet Kállay de Nagy-Kálló (d. 1945)
- Magdolna Kállay de Nagy-Kálló (d. 1954)

== Death ==
Benjamin died in Vienna on 13 July 1903, while his wife Vilma outlived him for more than 37 years and died in Nógrádberczel on 25 August 1940.

== See also ==
- Bosniak nationalism

== Notes ==
Political offices
Preceded by József Szlávy	Joint Minister of Finance of Austria-Hungary; 1882–1903	Succeeded by Agenor Gołuchowski
