= Ashkenazy =

Ashkenazy is a Jewish surname. Notable people with the name include:

- Ben Ashkenazy (born 1968/69), American billionaire real estate developer
- Dimitri Ashkenazy (born 1969), clarinetist
- Severyn Ashkenazy (born 1936), American hotelier and philanthropist
- Vladimir Ashkenazy (born 1937), pianist and conductor
- Vovka Ashkenazy (born 1961), pianist and pedagogue

== Businesses ==
- Ashkenazy Acquisition, a private real estate investment firm

== See also ==
- Ashkenazi Jews
- Ashkenazi (surname)
