= Architecture of Mostar =

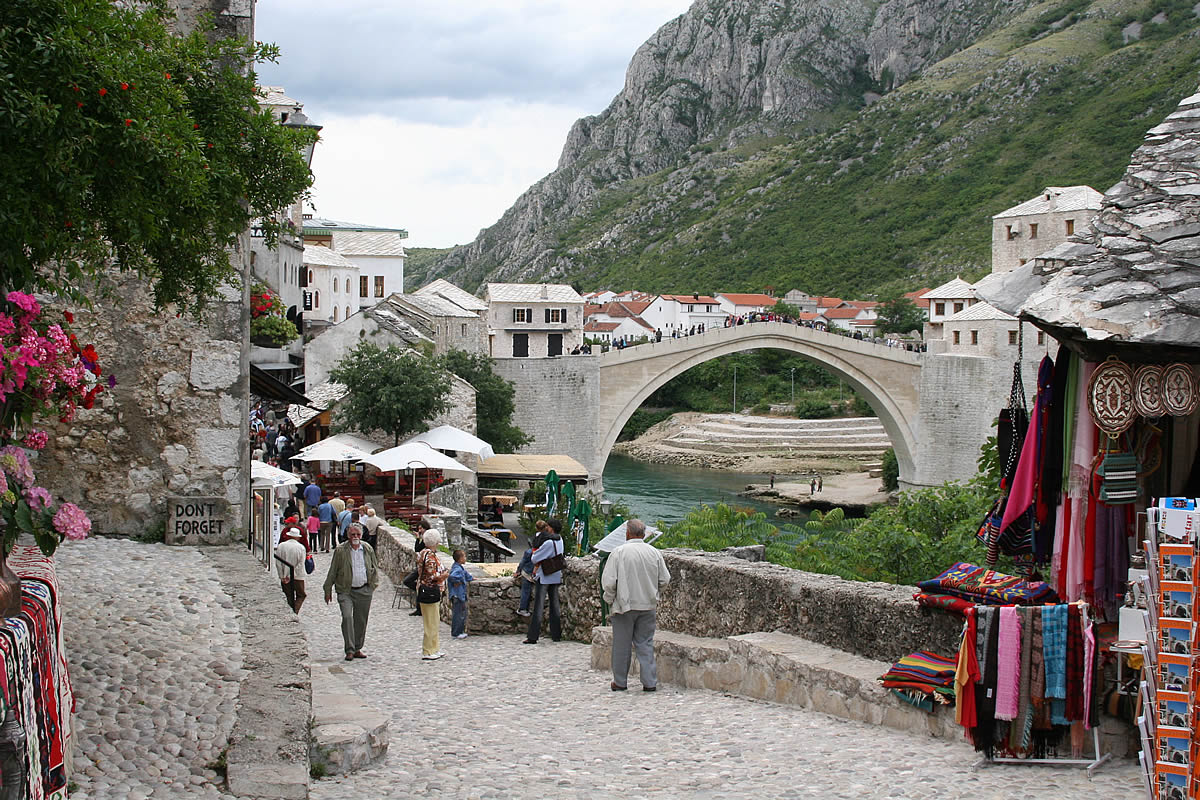
Mostar's Old Bridge and the nearby street.

Centuries before the Ottoman conquest of Bosnia, Mostar was a small hamlet situated at a strategic crossing of the Neretva river. Its hinterlands consisted of a broad agricultural plain on the west bank and steep terraces on the east bank surrounded by barren mountains. Mostar was a representative multi-ethnic and multi-cultural settlement in Bosnia and Herzegovina, which had possessed an independent political identity since the twelfth century. By the fifteenth century, most of the lands that would later become part of modern Yugoslavia were inhabited primarily by peoples of the same south Slavic heritage.

== Ottoman era ==
The first document that names the city was written in 1474, only eleven years after the Ottoman conquest of Bosnia. The bridge is at the heart of the town's identity: Mostar means in fact “bridgekeeper”. Bosnia was added to the Ottoman Empire as a province and ruled by a pasha: an administrator of elevated rank. Following this occupation, Mostar was transformed, in a matter of decades, from a minor river crossing to a thriving colonial crossroads. As Ottoman administrators strove to integrate local inhabitants into their empire and extend their influence, architecture expressed important social and economic changes in Mostar. During the Ottoman period, the Stari Most was built to replace a precarious wooden suspension bridge that had spanned the river. Facilitating travel, trade and the movement of military troops, the Stari Most became a symbol of the benevolence and power of the Ottoman Empire; it insured Mostar's primacy as the capital of the county of Herzegovina.

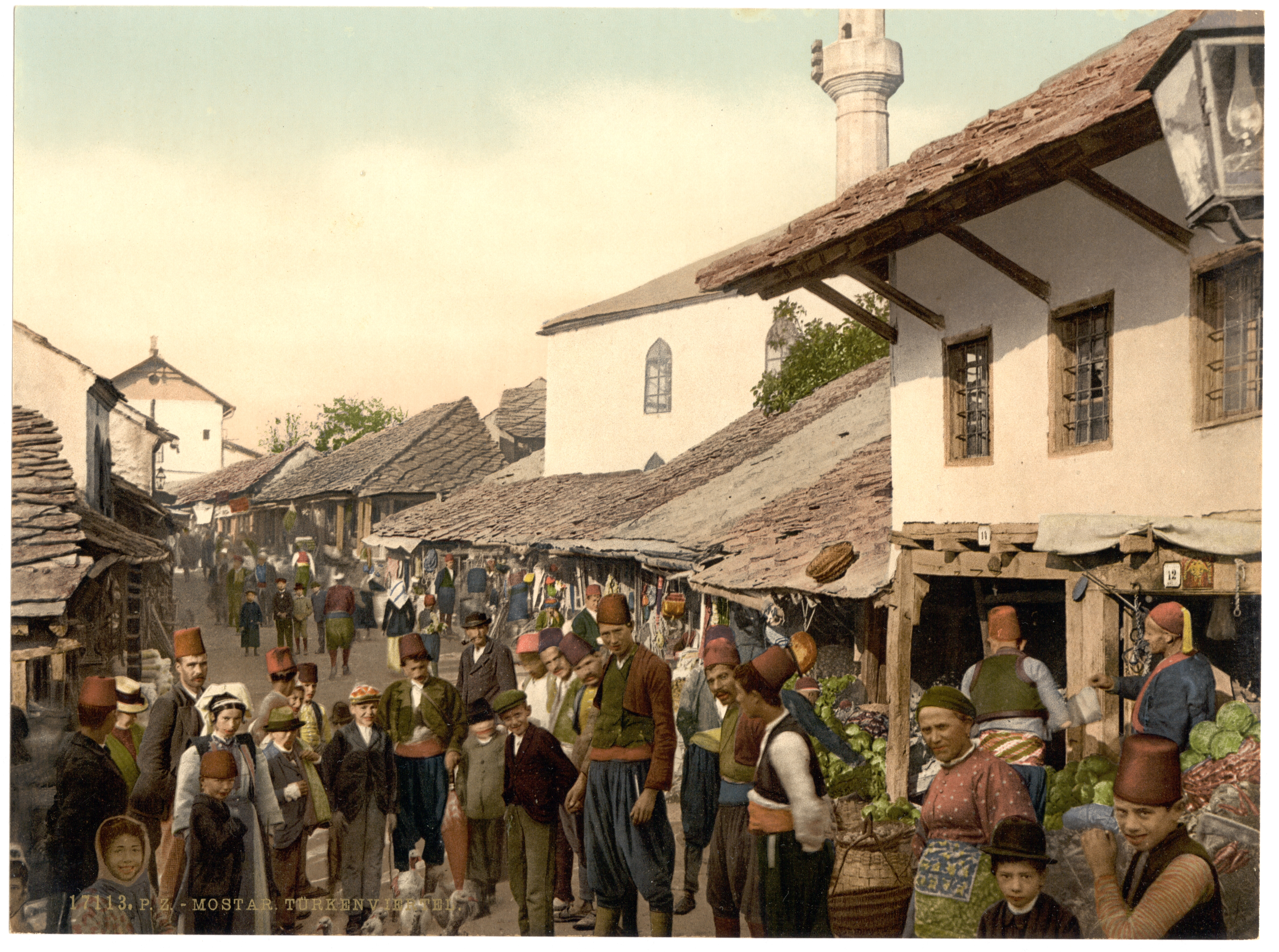
Mostar Street in 1890–1900

The Ottomans used monumental architecture to affirm, extend and consolidate their colonial holdings. Administrators and bureaucrats – many of them indigenous Bosnians who converted to Islam – founded mosque complexes that generally included Koranic schools, soup kitchens or markets. These foundations, or vakufs, were a traditional mode of philanthropy which allowed for routine distribution of wealth within the empire. The grandest mosques were characterized by a large single dome, like the Koski Mehmet Paša Mosque in Mostar on the east bank of the Neretva or the Karadjozbeg Mosque, bearing many hallmarks of the famous Ottoman architect Sinan. The dome had come to represent the imperial presence of the Ottomans throughout the territories they controlled; it seems to have signified both Ottoman dominion over a colony and benevolence towards the colonized. Mosques defined and strengthened communities. A good example is the Sevri Hadži Hasan Mosque, a hip-roofed structure that forms the nucleus and principal public open space of its neighborhood, or mahalla. Such mahallas developed quickly on both banks of the Neretva during the Ottoman period. One- and two-storey houses were anonymous at the street level but rich and expressive within. Each was carefully sited to catch a view of a cypress or minaret from second-story windows and each was legally obliged not to block the views of a neighbor. A street-level entry would access the courtyard, creating a transition that allowed for intimacy and privacy within; rooms dedicated to family life were separated from those intended to receive outsiders. Mostar's Biščevića house is a case in point: an austere entrance belies rooms of built-in cabinets, elaborately carved wooden ceilings and a windowed room that cantilevers over the Neretva River. In thriving commercial areas, houses like the Alajbegovica house addressed the commercial thoroughfare with a shop, with residential spaces above and behind.

Though Mostar was officially part of the Ottoman Empire until the third quarter of the nineteenth century, all of the territories that would later become Bosnia and Herzegovina enjoyed an unusual measure of independence in the eighteenth and most of the nineteenth centuries. Ottoman legislation assuring religious tolerance between Christians, Muslims and Jews had become an integral part of indigenous social and political values, and the city functioned as a bonded, multicultural social entity. In Mostar, historicist architectural styles reflected cosmopolitan interest and exposure to foreign aesthetic trends and were artfully merged with indigenous styles. Examples include the Italianate Franciscan church, the Ottoman Muslibegovića house, the Dalmatian Ćorovića House and an Orthodox church built with a gift from the Sultan.

== Austro-Hungarian era ==
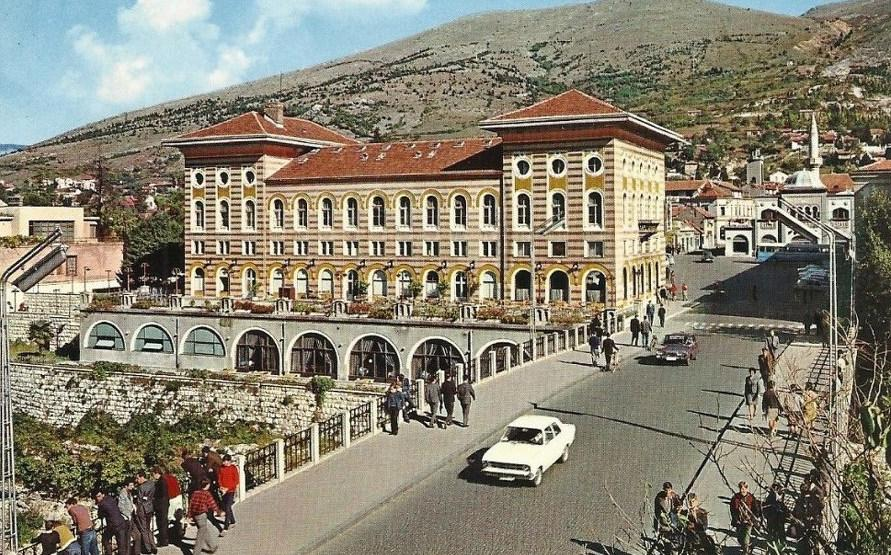
Hotel Neretva, designed by Alexander Wittek in 1890, in Moorish Revival Style

Austro-Hungarian occupation of Bosnia and Herzegovina in 1878 led Mostar's city council to aspire to autonomy, but it cooperated with the Austro-Hungarians to implement sweeping reforms in city planning: broad avenues and an urban grid were imposed on the western bank of the Neretva, and significant investments were made in infrastructure, communications and housing.

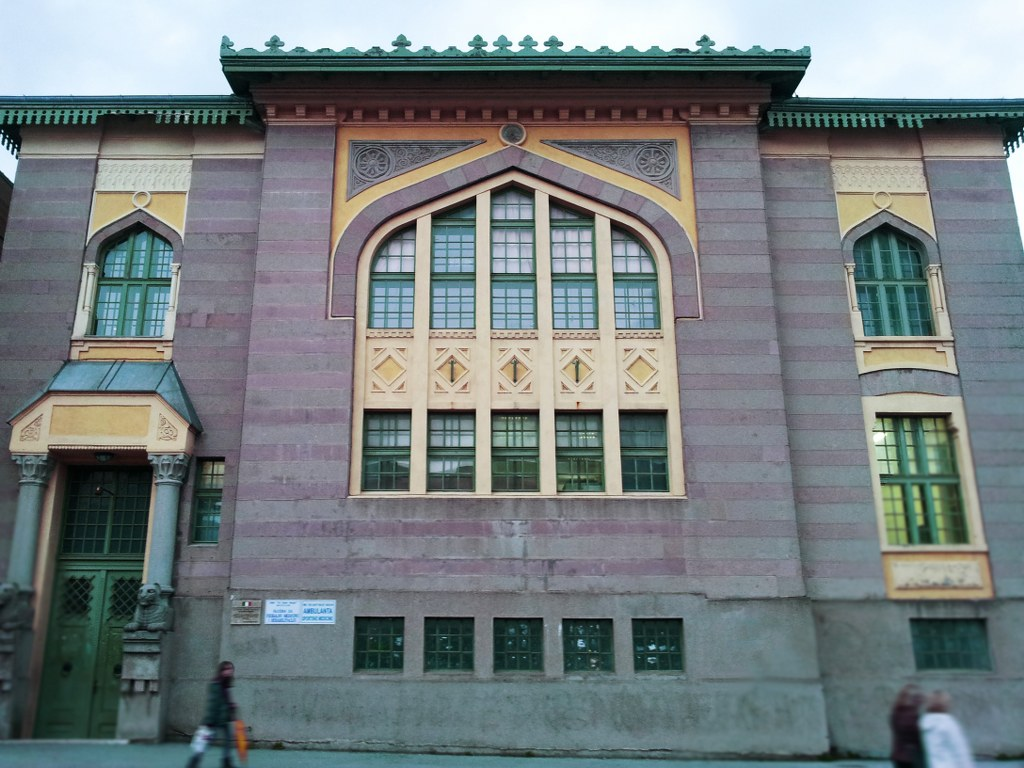
City Bath in Mostar

The change of government in August 1878 introduced a lively urban development in Mostar. With a significant amount of capital infused, the city council began implementing broad reforms in city planning. New government envisioned the city's past and present on the east bank of Neretva and Mostar's future on the west bank.

Consequently, broad avenues and an urban grid appeared on the west bank of the Neretva, while at the same time, significant investment was made in infrastructure, communications, and rental housing. The real-estate speculation began a process, which would benefit some sectors of society while victimizing others. Such intensive growth posed new communal problems for the city's government. During the early years of the Austro- Hungarian administration construction of a new water supply system in 1885, a city sewage, and electrical power line-network, as well as street illumination were all accomplished in a relatively short time.

A contemporary hospital was completed in 1888; a first post office in Bosnia and Herzegovina was opened in 1858; a fire brigade station was instituted in 1885 and a Meteorology station was established in 1903. The city gained a new power plant in 1912, and in 1894, street illumination replaced the 330 lanterns that were initially used. Telephone service for civil customers was introduced to Mostar in 1906, while a Military Airport Mostar, first one in the Balkans was established in 1913.

Number and structure of population were changing rapidly. In 1885 Mostar there were 1,975 houses, 2,104 the dwelling units occupied by 12,665 inhabitants, of whom 6,442 were men and 6,223 women. Population consisted of 6,825 Muslims, 3,369 Orthodox, and 2,359 Catholics, 98 Jews and 17 followers of other religions. Among the total number of inhabitants 7,035 were bachelors and 4,356 were married. By April 22, 1895, Mostar had 17,010 residents of a which 6, 946 were Muslims, 3, 877 were Orthodox Christians, 3, 353 were Catholics and 164 Jews.

Over one tenth of the city population (or 1715 people) were part of the Austro-Hungarian administration, or had come from abroad to profit from it. From administrative point of view, from February, 1889 Mostar was functioning as a City-State. It was divided into eight zones, five of which were on the east bank of the Neretva River: Carina, Luka, Brankovac, Bjelušine, the Old City; and three were on the west bank of Neretva River: Cernica, Prethum, Zahum.

City administrators like Mustafa Mujaga Komadina were central players in these transformations, which facilitated growth and linked the eastern and western banks of the city.

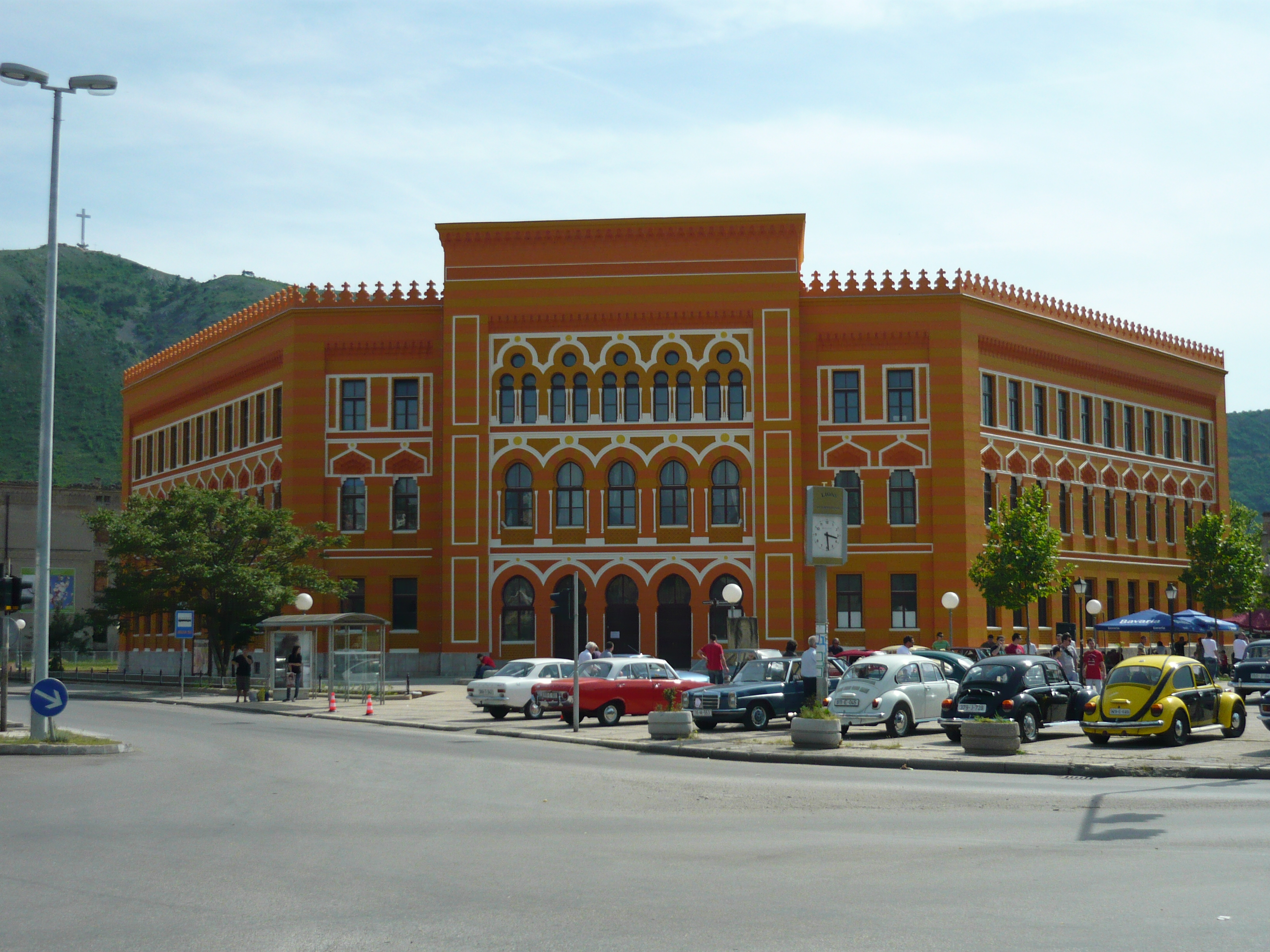
František Blažek’s Gymnasium of 1902 built in Moorish Revival style.

New monuments and architectural styles reflected the aspirations of Mostarians and the Austro-Hungarian administration. Monolithic neo-Renaissance buildings towered over their diminutive Ottoman predecessors and introduced sober, imposing street walls to the city. One example is the Municipality building. Designed by the architect Josip Vancaš from Sarajevo, it asserted a new prosperity, stability and tradition, linking Mostar symbolically with other European centers. Residential districts around the Rondo invited grand single-family homes and reaffirmed an occidental influence that complemented the city’s traditional buildings. By the early twentieth century, elements of Art Nouveau and Secessionist styles began to appear in Mostar’s historicist buildings, such as Josip Vancaš’s Landbank constructed in 1910.

The inevitable hybrid that emerged from this period of intense building was a new monumental style that combined the massing of European prototypes with Orientalist details, namely structures built in Moorish Revival architecture style. This combination is illustrated well in Hotel Neretva by Alexander Wittek and Gimnazija Mostar by František Blažek’s. Though its design was derived from Islamic styles of Spain and North Africa and bears no genuine relation with Mostar’s Ottoman past, it reflects the tendency of Austro-Hungarian administrators to harmonize rather than suppress cultural difference within the empire. Mostar Bathhouse was built in similar, Moorish Revival architecture, style.

In May 1911 Mostar mayor, Mustafa Mujaga Komadina, introduced the preparations for construction of a Mostar Bathhouse to a district authorities in Mostar. Initial building design was made by a Mostar native, Miroslav Lose, the then manager of the municipal water supply. On the recommendation of Mujaga Komadina, the Council sent Lose abroad to study public bathhouses. Mostar Bathhouse was opened on June 3, 1914.

== World War I to Socialism ==
The First World War was triggered in Sarajevo when Serbian Black Hand radicals confirmed their distaste for the incumbent empire by assassinating its heir, Archduke Franz Ferdinand. Fearing annexation by the Serbians, most Bosnians were loyal to the Austro-Hungarian Empire during the World War I. Pragmatism and international pressure in light of a re-aligned Europe at the close of the war forged the Kingdom of Serbs, Croats and Slovenes (later Kingdom of Yugoslavia), a constitutional monarchy that included Bosnia and Herzegovina under the leadership of Serbia’s Prince Regent Alexander. His attempts to “erase the old regional identities” antagonized all parties, culminating in a suspension of the constitution.

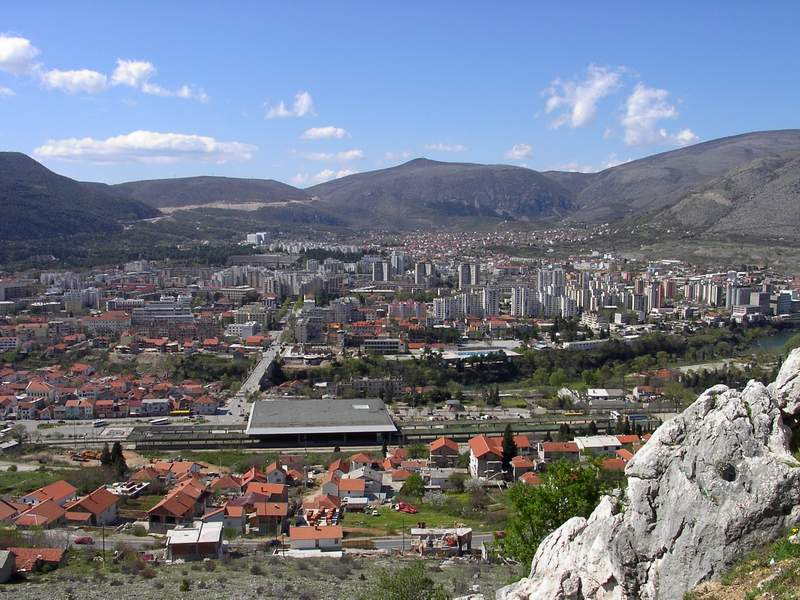
Panoramic View of Mostar

These internal conflicts were soon overshadowed by the advance of Hitler and the German alliance with the fascist Independent State of Croatia (Nezavisna Država Hrvatska). The Partisan resistance in the region grew under the direction of Josip Broz Tito, and attracted large numbers of Bosnians. At the close of World War II, Tito was at the heart of a new socialist Yugoslavia. Between 1948 and 1974, Yugoslavia evolved from a repressive socialist regime to a federate socialist nation made up of discrete republics, of which one was Bosnia-Herzegovina. During this period in Mostar, the industrial base was expanded with construction of a metal-working factory, cotton textile mills, and an aluminum plant. Skilled workers, both men and women, entered the work force and the social and demographic profile of the city was broadened dramatically; between 1945 and 1980, Mostar's population grew from 18,000 to 100,000.

Because Mostar's eastern bank was burdened by inadequate infrastructure, the city expanded on the western bank with the construction of large residential blocks. Local architects favored an austere modernist aesthetic, prefabrication and repetitive modules. Commercial buildings in the functionalist style appeared on the historic eastern side of the city as well, replacing more intimate timber constructions that had survived since Ottoman times. In the 1970s and 1980s, a healthy local economy fueled by foreign investment spurred recognition and conservation of the city's cultural heritage. An economically sustainable plan to preserve the old town of Mostar was implemented by the municipality, which drew thousands of tourists from the Adriatic coast and invigorated the economy of the city. The results of this ten-year project earned Mostar an Aga Khan Award for Architecture in 1986.

== Collapse of Yugoslavia ==
During the collapse of communism in Eastern Europe, ultra-nationalist leaders in the republics enjoyed political ascendancy which would have been unthinkable under Tito. Alija Izetbegović formed a new government in Bosnia, which included the representation of Bosnian-Muslim, Bosnian-Croat and Bosnian-Serb parties. In 1992, 64% of the Bosnian electorate voted for a state “of equal citizens and nations of Muslims, Serbs, Croats and others”. Days later, Sarajevo was under a siege that would last more than three years. During this same period, Bosnian Serb military and paramilitary forces pursued a campaign of terror and ethnic cleansing in Bosnia. Mostar was overwhelmed by Serbian military units, and shelled from the surrounding hills during May and June 1992. Nearly 100,000 people were forced from their homes and over 1,600 died. Many historic buildings in the old city, including most of the city's important mosques, were heavily damaged. Even the Old Bridge was hit by a shell.

A Croat-Muslim Federation was able to expel Serbian forces by June 1992. Shortly thereafter, local Muslims and Croatians became adversaries due to competing territorial ambitions and ongoing political instability. The Bosnian-Croatian Militia (the HVO) took possession of the West Bank of the Neretva and a new round of hostilities in what was termed the “second battle of Mostar” ensued. More than 3,000 people were killed, and another 10,000 Bosniaks and Serbs were sent to concentration camps. On November 9, 1993, the bridge's springline was hit at point-blank range by a Croatian tank shell and Mostar's 400-year-old symbol fell into the cold Neretva River, provoking deep sadness for citizens throughout the city for whom the Bridge had represented everything permanent and inviolable.

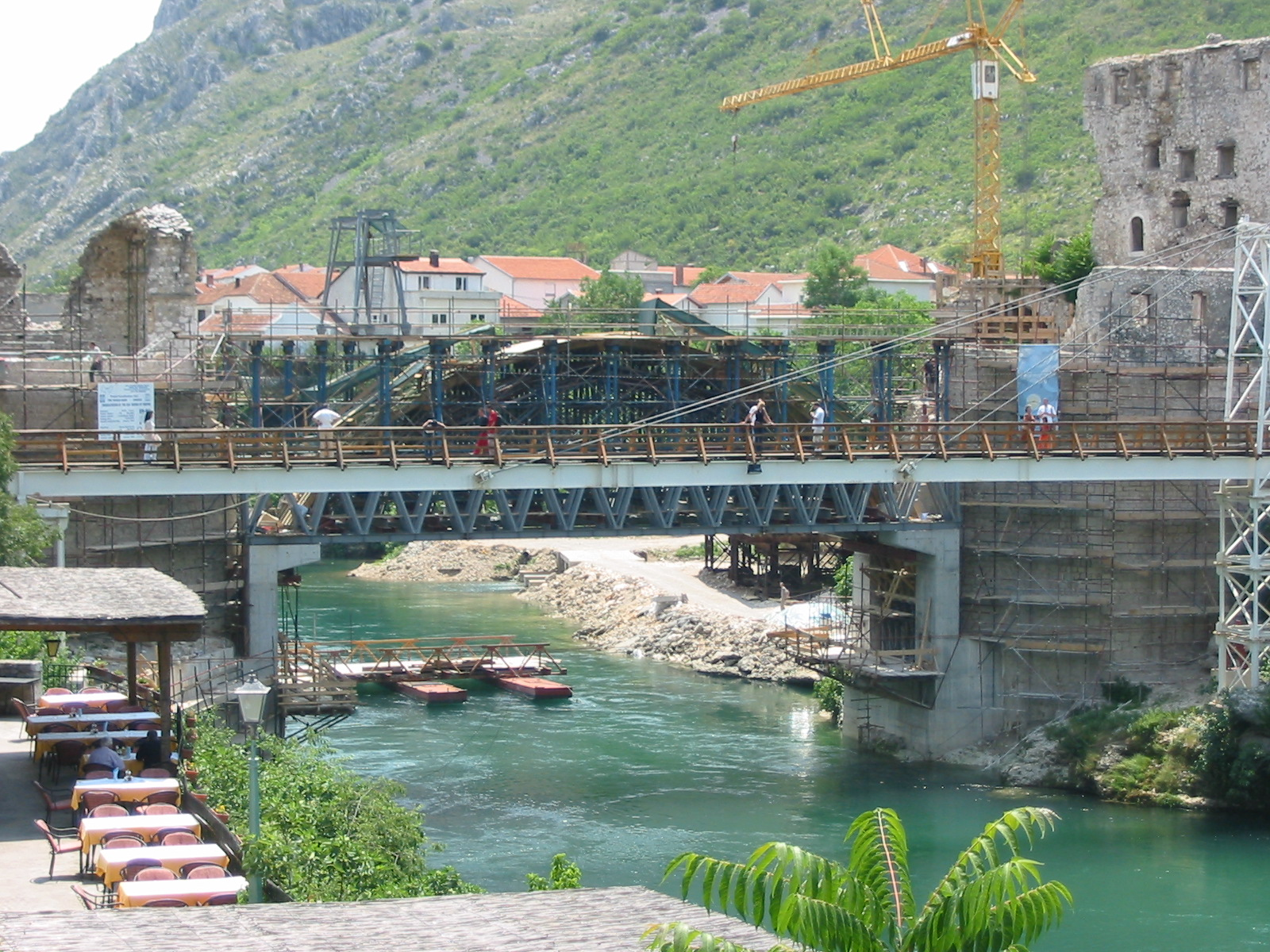
The Old Bridge undergoing reconstruction in June 2003.

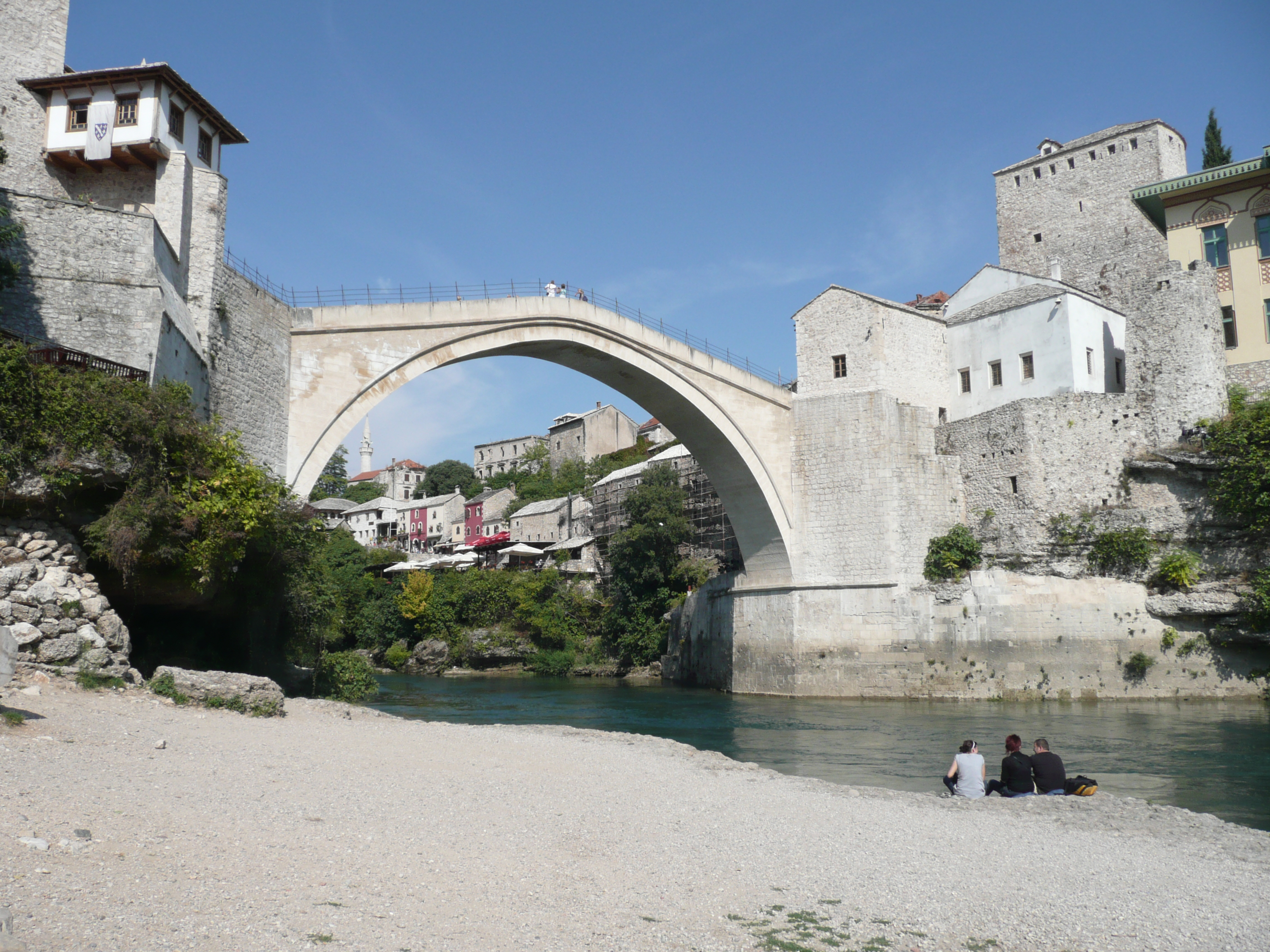
The Old Bridge in September 2008 after reconstruction.

== Reconstruction ==
Since the end of the wider war in 1995, great progress is being made in the reconstruction of the city of Mostar. The city was under direct monitoring from a European Union envoy, several elections were held and each nation was accommodated with regard to political control over the city. Over 15 million dollars has been spent on restoration.

A monumental project to rebuild the Old Bridge to the original design, and restore surrounding structures and historic neighbourhoods was initiated in 1999 and mostly completed by Spring 2004. The money for this reconstruction was donated by Spain (who had a sizable contingent of peacekeeping troops stationed in the surrounding area during the conflict), the United States, Turkey, Italy, the Netherlands, and Croatia. A grand opening was held on July 23, 2004 under heavy security.

In parallel with the restoration of the Old Bridge, the Aga Khan Trust for Culture and the World Monuments Fund undertook a five-year-long restoration and rehabilitation effort in historic Mostar. Realizing early on that the reconstruction of the bridge without an in-depth rehabilitation of the surrounding historic neighbourhoods would be devoid of context and meaning, they shaped the programme in such a way as to establish a framework of urban conservation schemes and individual restoration projects that would help regenerate the most significant areas of historic Mostar, and particularly the urban tissue around the Old Bridge. The project also resulted in the establishment of the Stari Grad Agency which has an important role in overseeing the ongoing implementation of the conservation plan, as well as operating and maintaining a series of restored historic buildings (including the Old Bridge complex) and promoting Mostar as a cultural and tourist destination. The official inauguration of the Stari grad Agency coincided with the opening ceremony of the Bridge.

In July 2005, UNESCO finally inscribed the Old Bridge and its closest vicinity onto the World Heritage List.

== Gallery ==
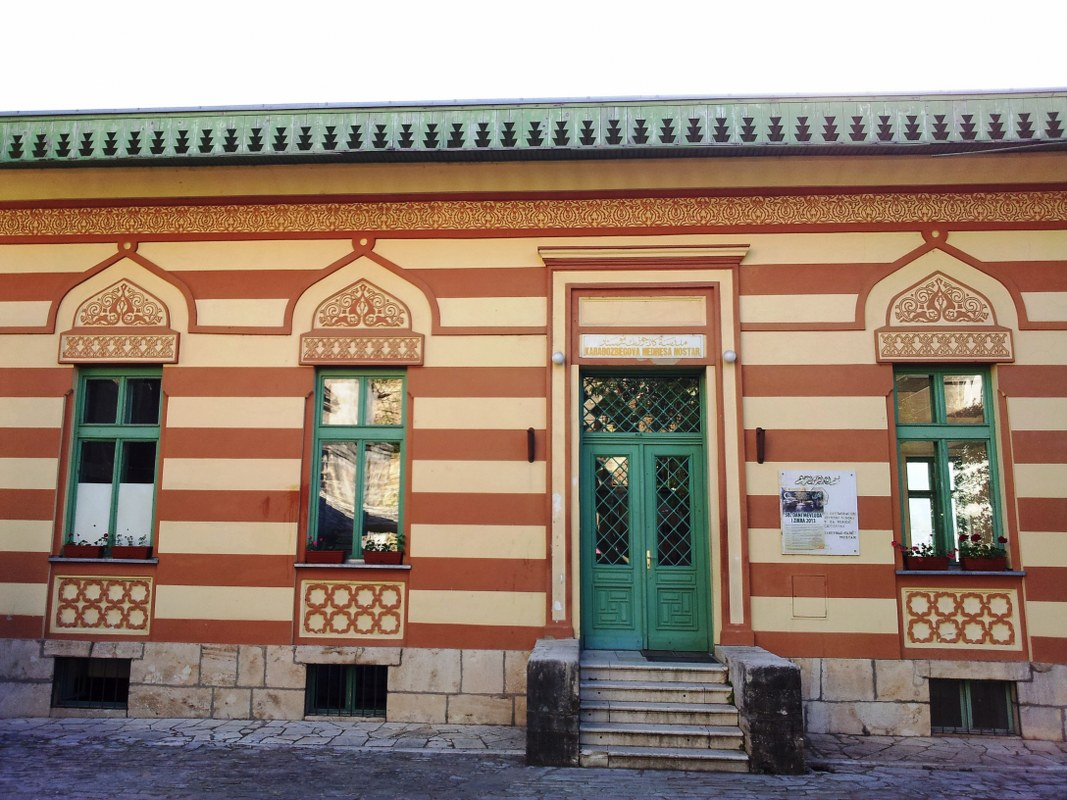
Mostar Madrasa in the Old Town, Mostar

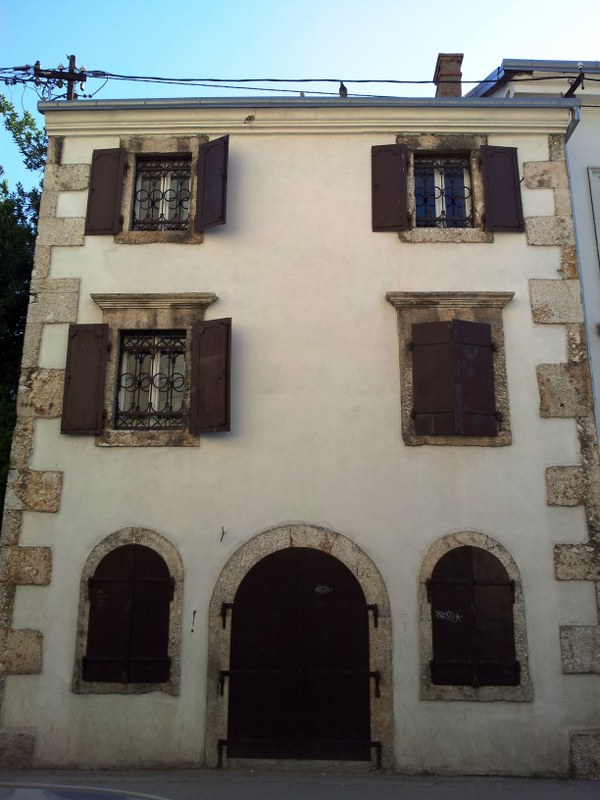
Building in the Old Town, Mostar

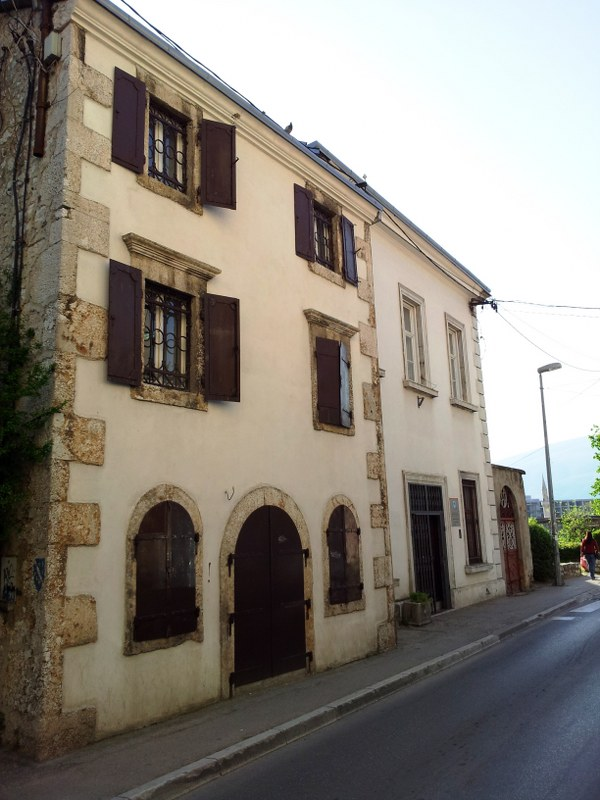
Street in the Old Town, Mostar

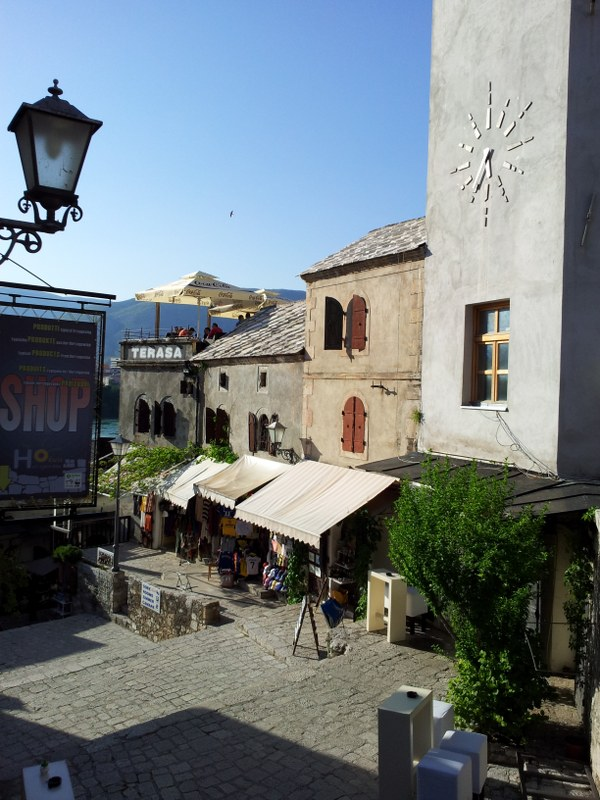
Street in the Old Town, Mostar

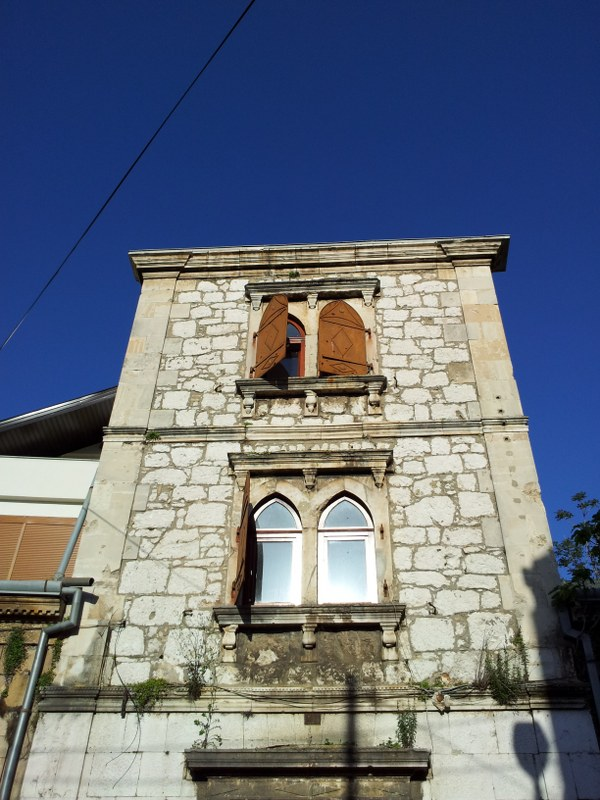
Street in the Old Town, Mostar

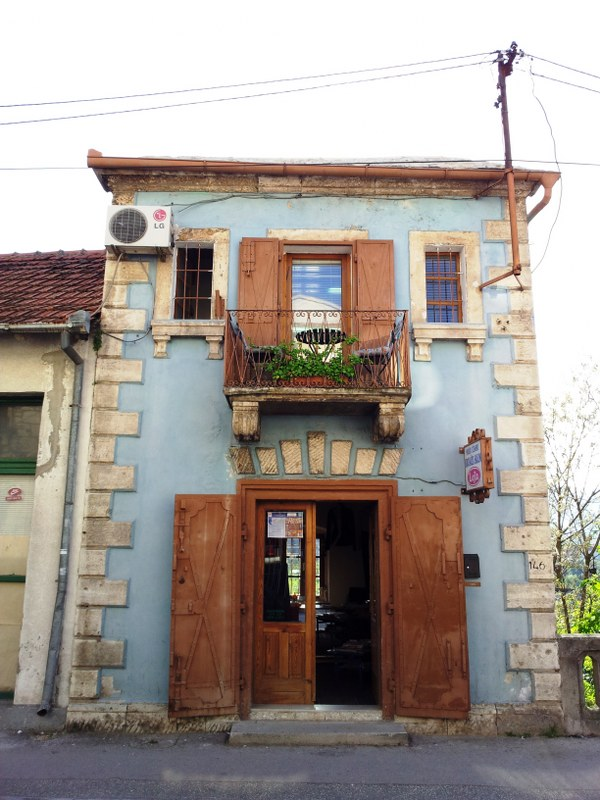
Building in the Old Town, Mostar

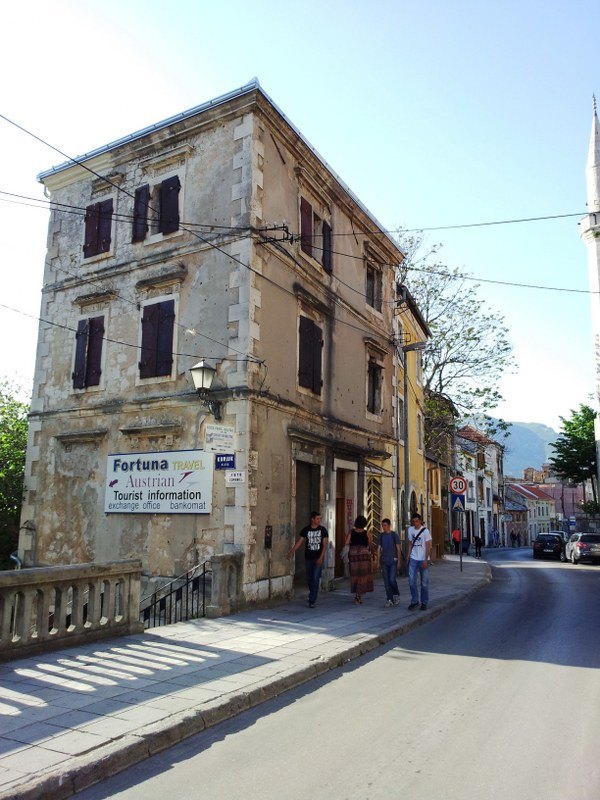
Street in the Old Town, Mostar

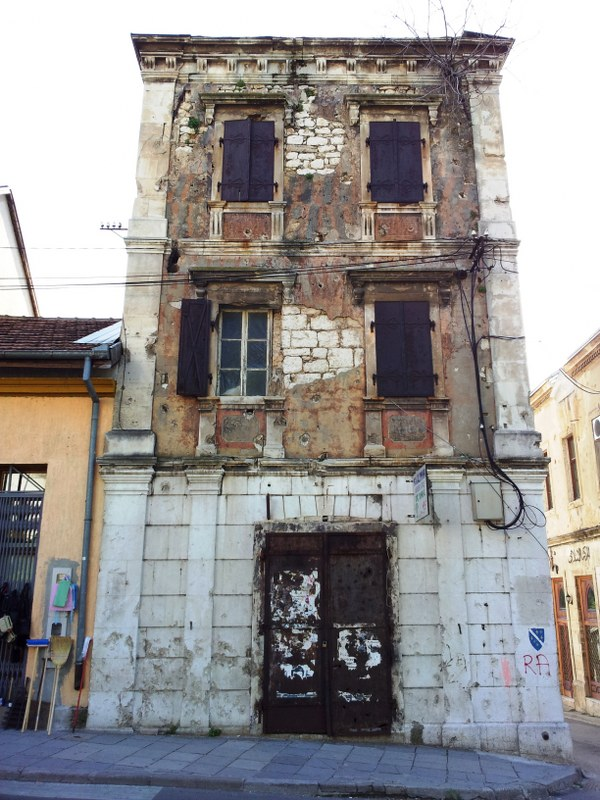
Building in the Old Town, Mostar

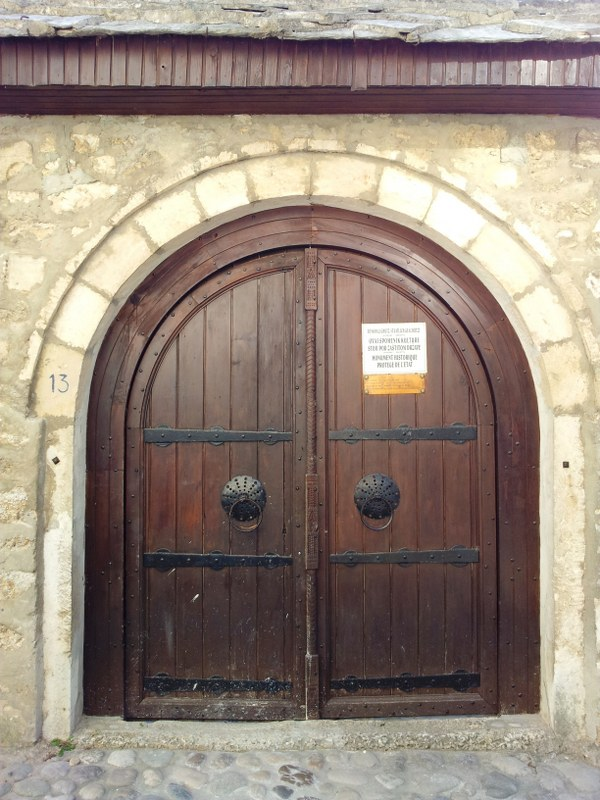
Entrance to the traditional Ottoman house in Mostar

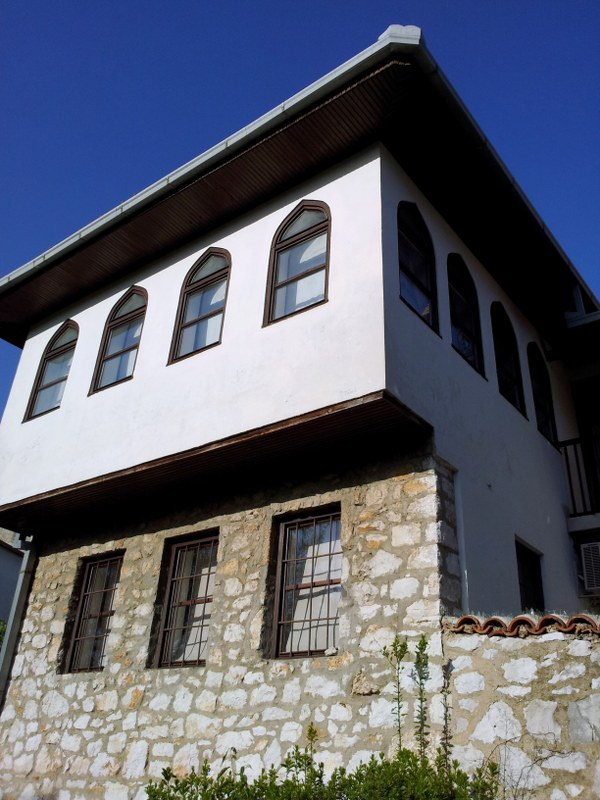
Family home in Mostar

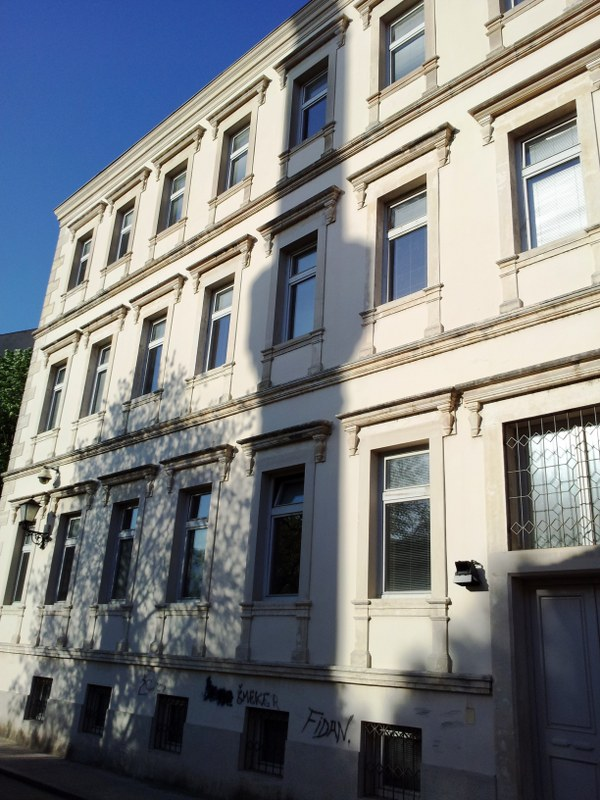
Facade in Fejica Street in Mostar

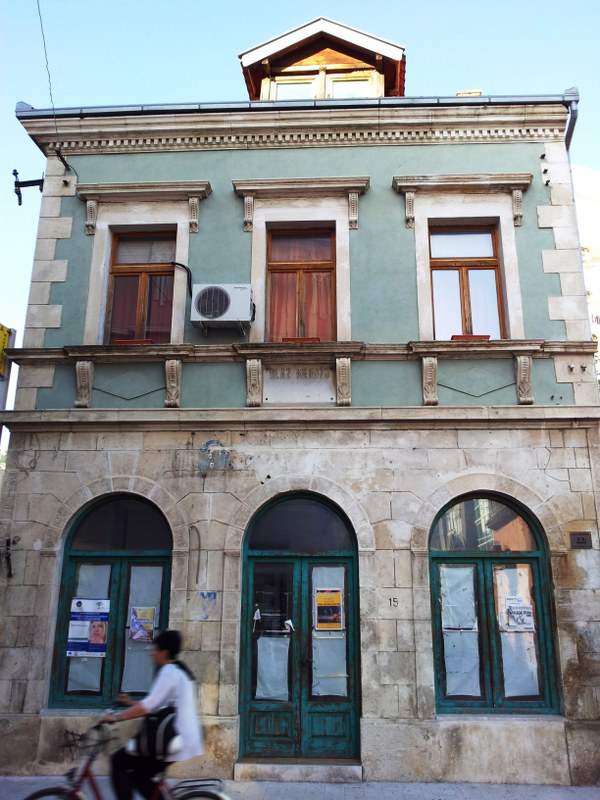
Facade in Fejica Street in Mostar

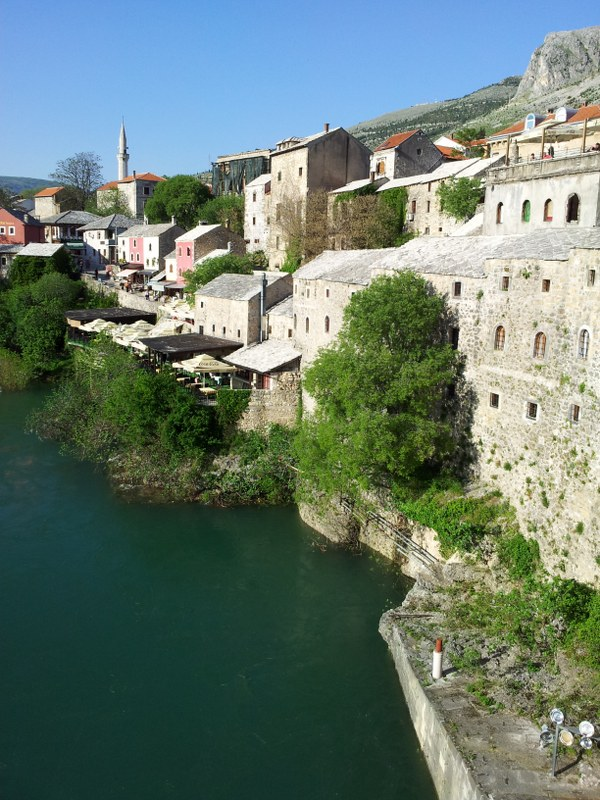
View from The Old Bridge in Mostar

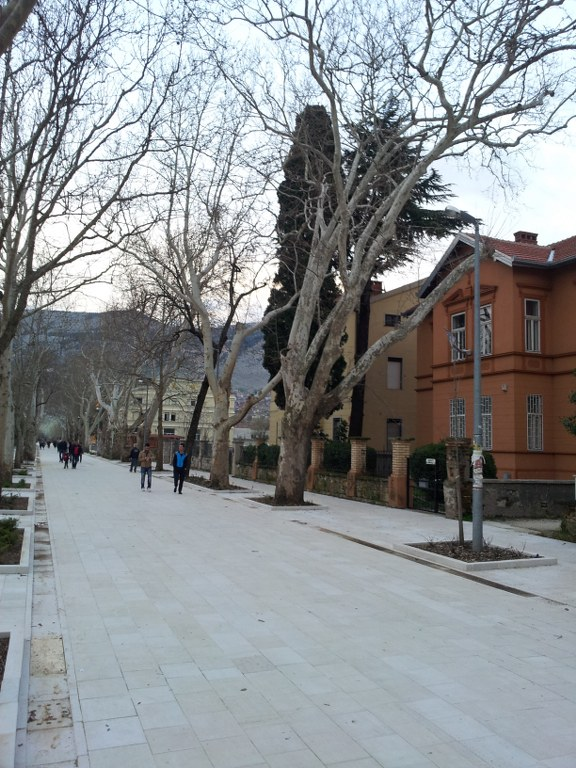
Street in Mostar

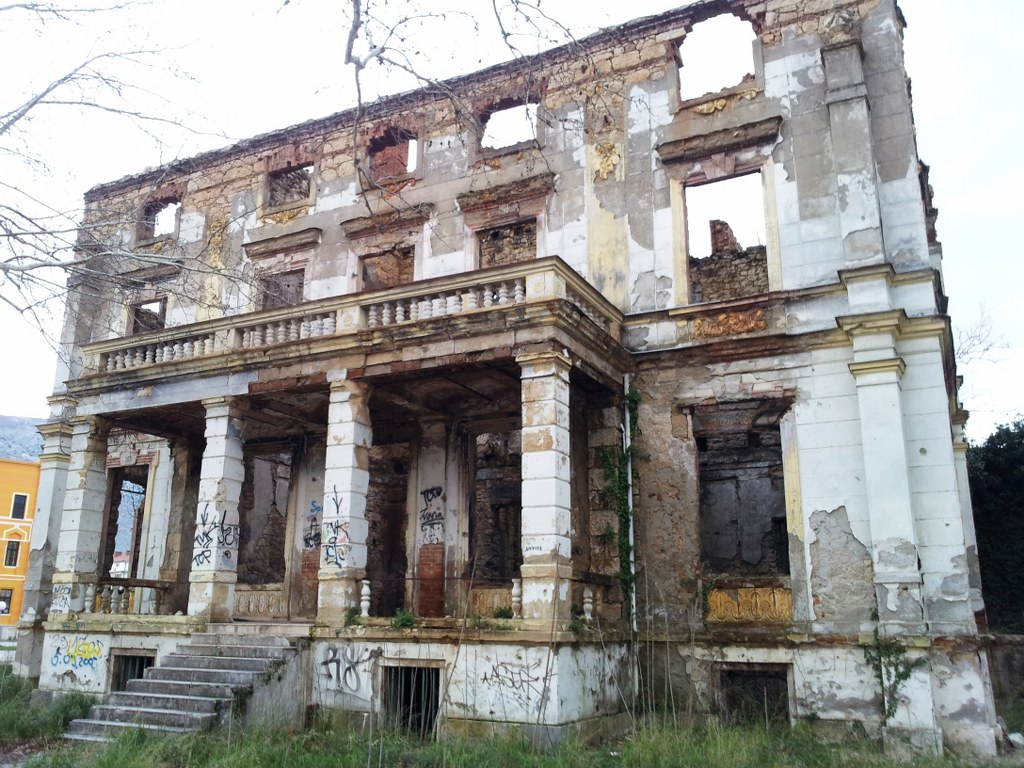
Ruin of a former University Library in Mostar

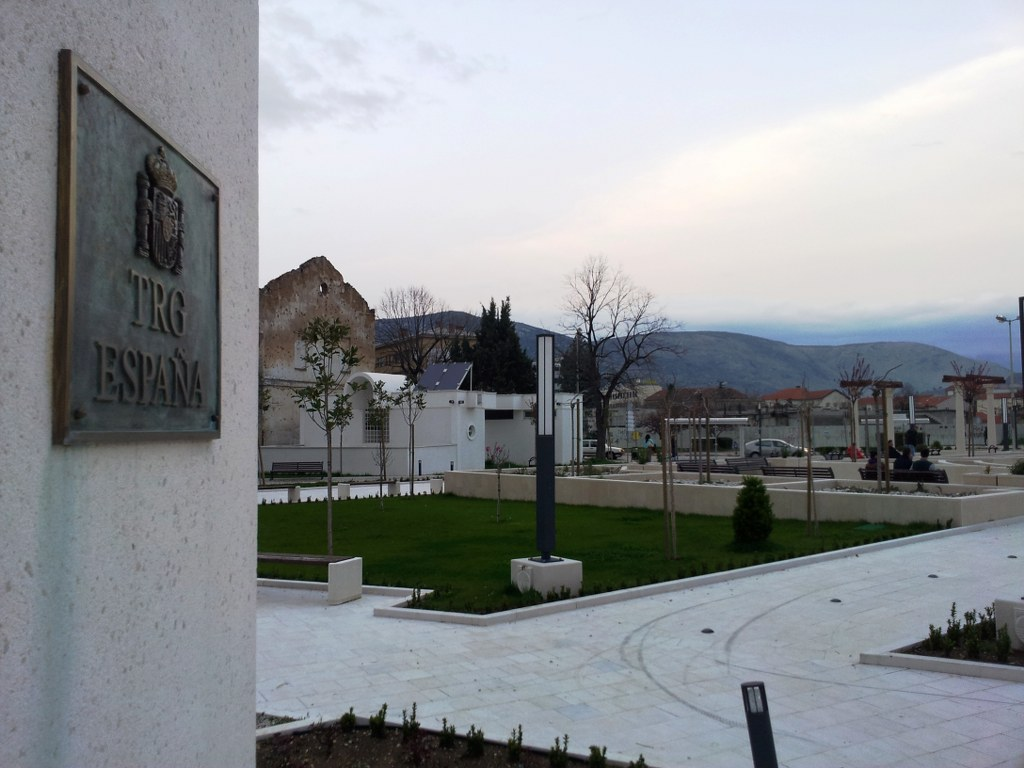
Spanish Square in Mostar

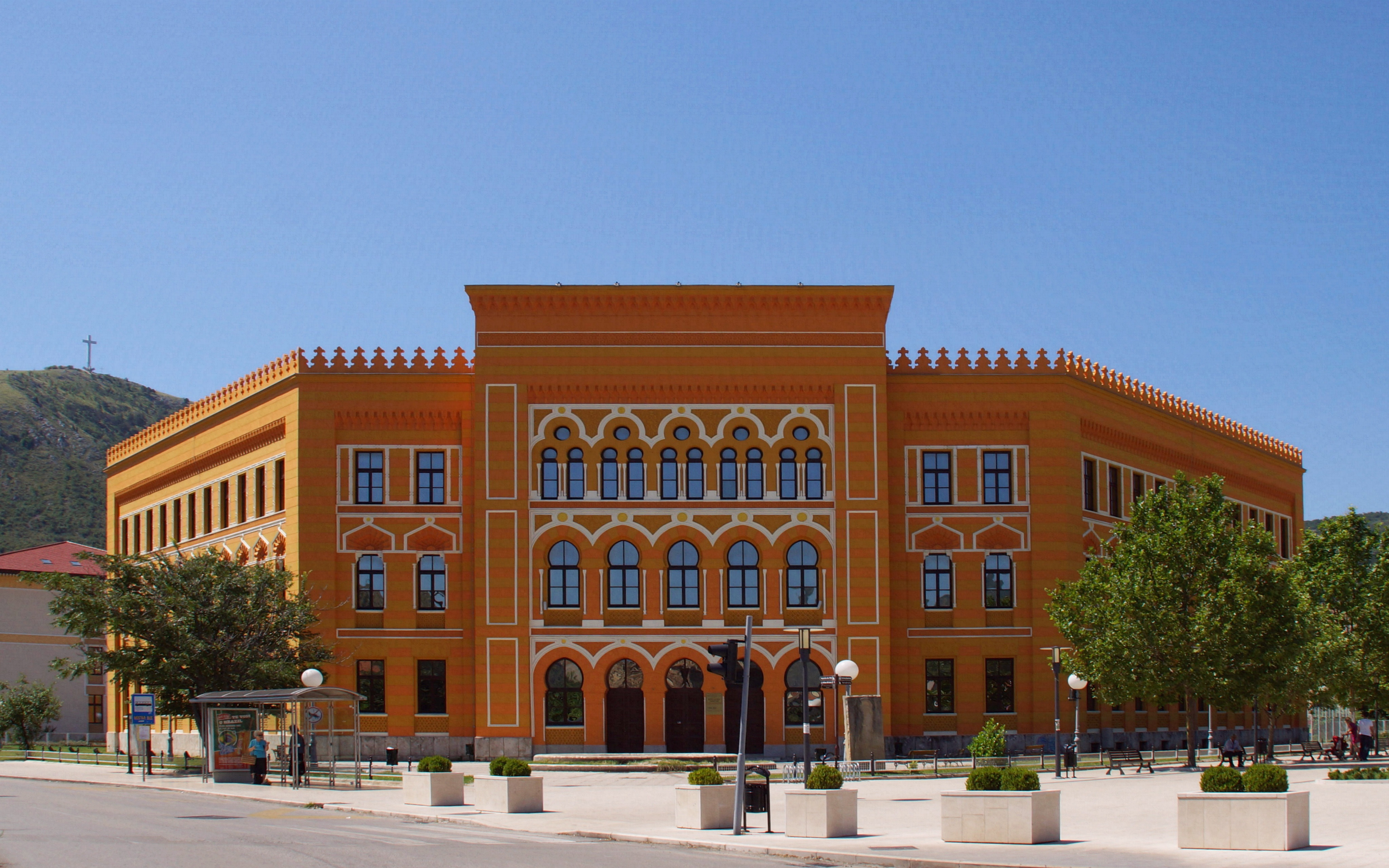
Gymnasium Mostar

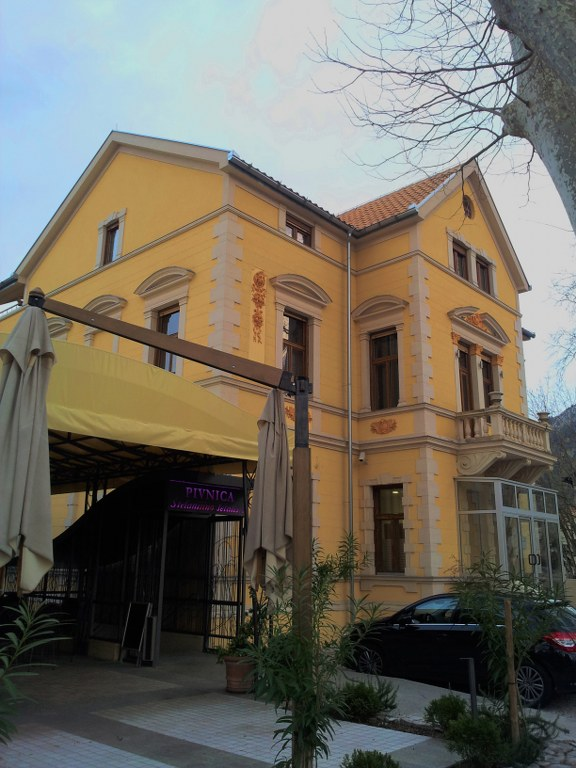
Pub in Mostar

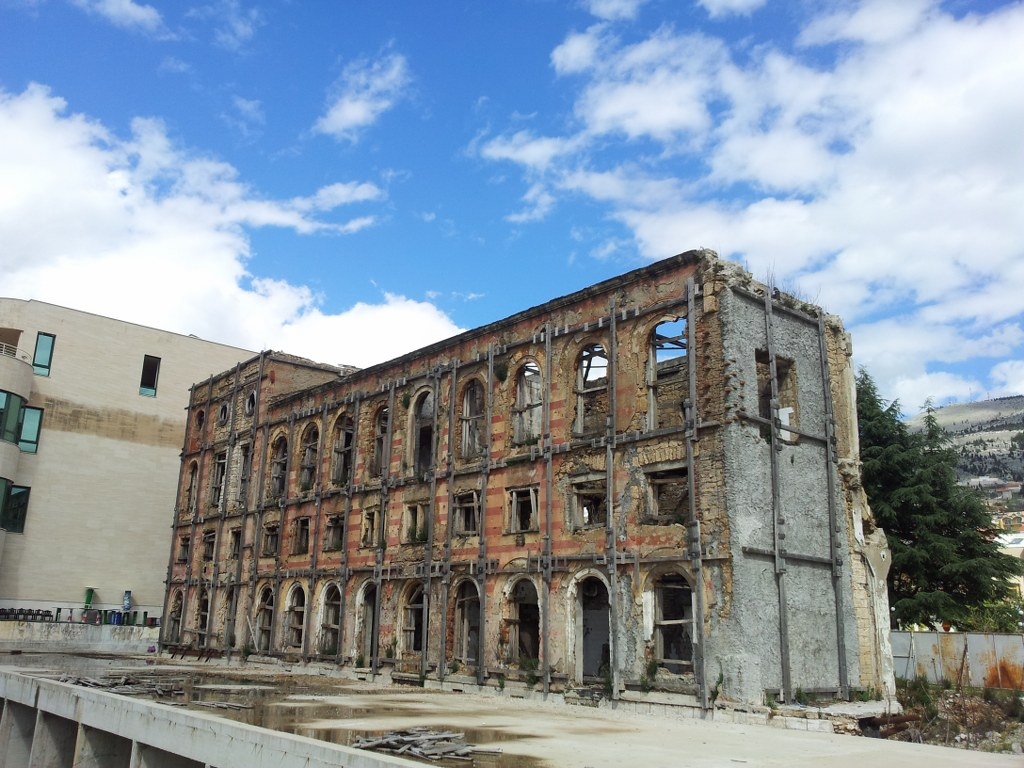
Hotel Neretva ruin

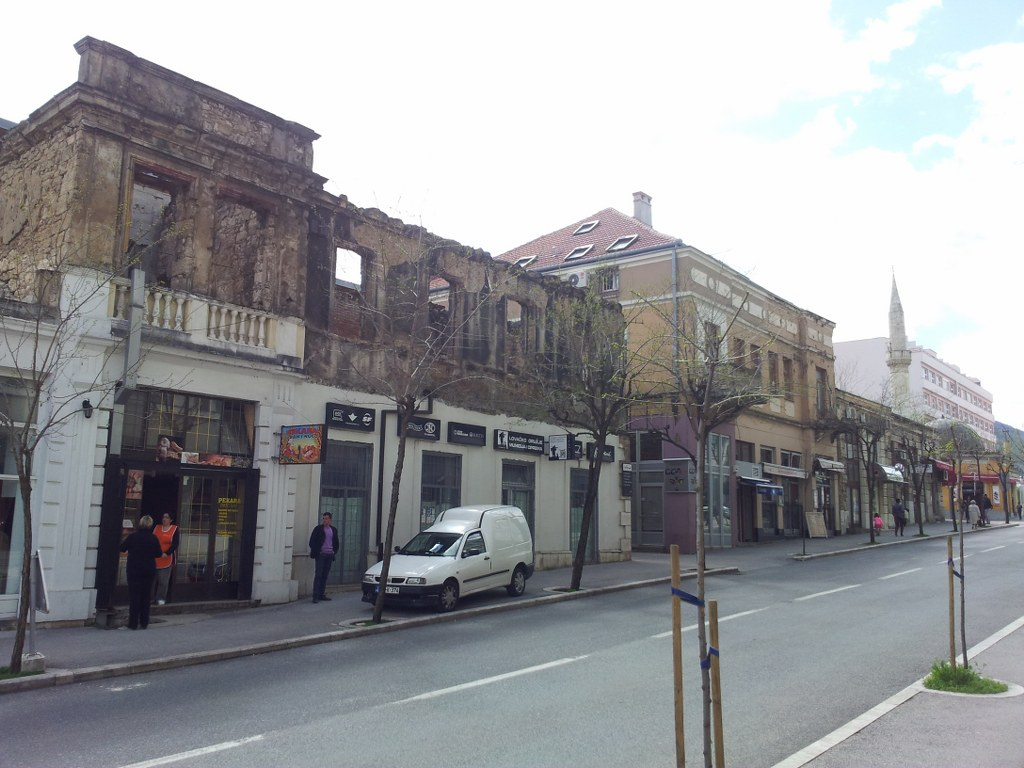
Mostar street

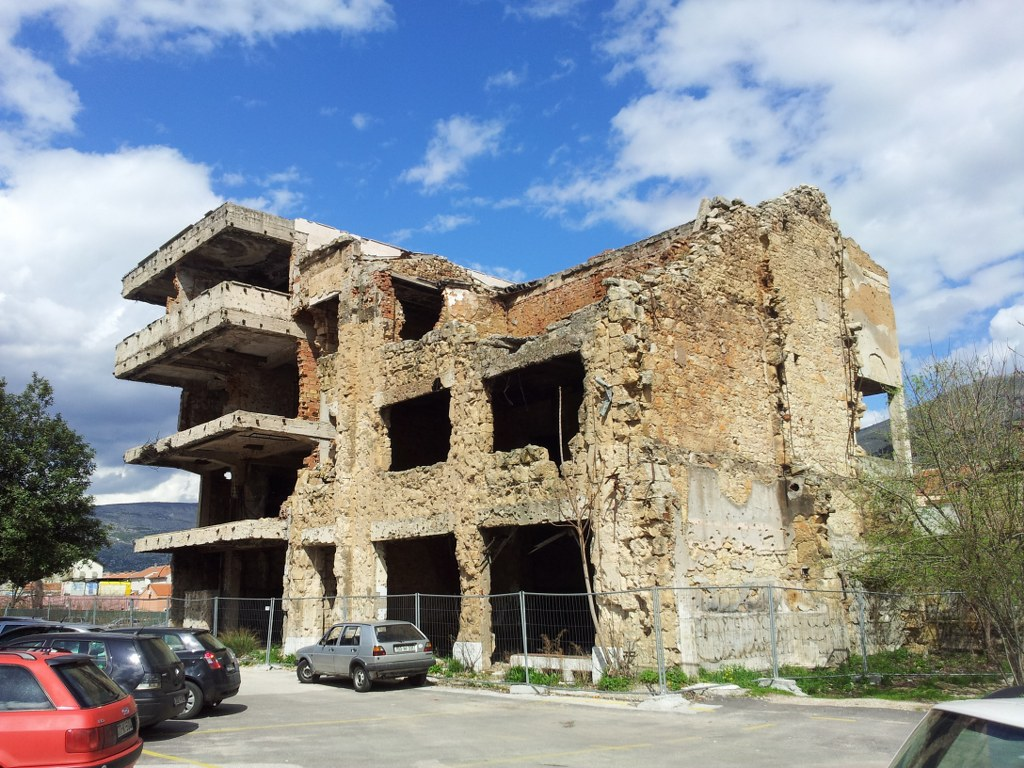
Ruin in Mostar

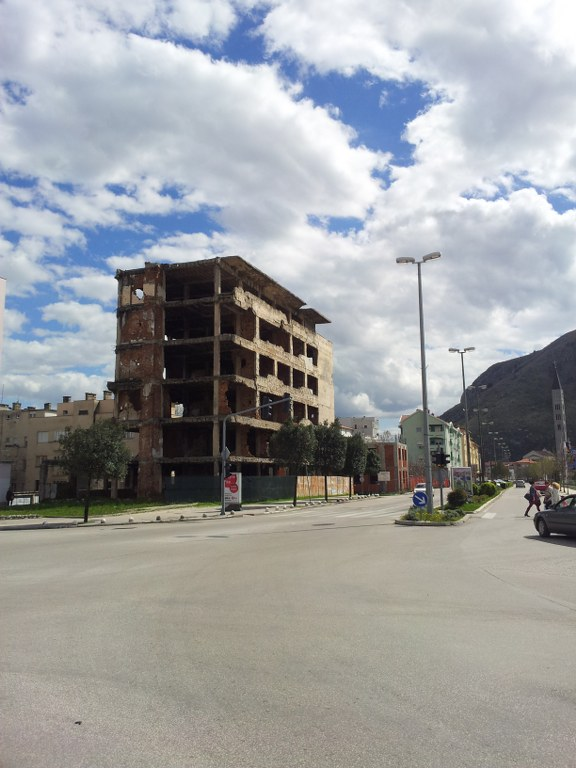
War ruin in Mostar

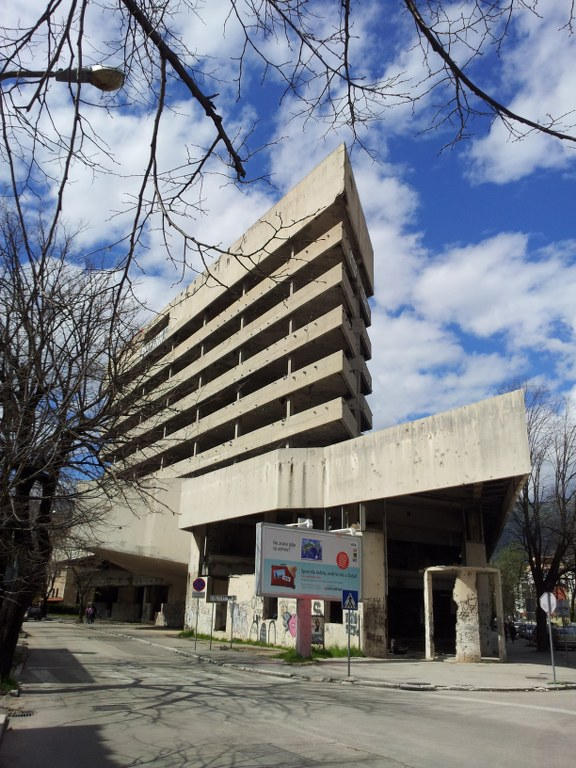
Ruin in Mostar

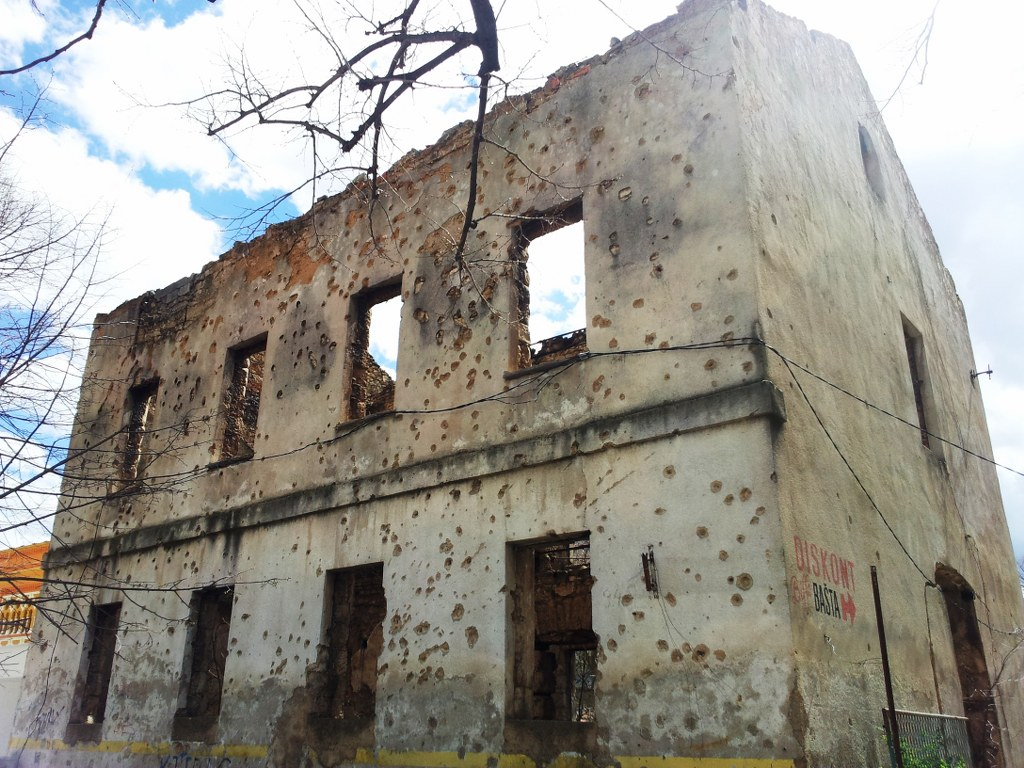
Mostar building ruined in war

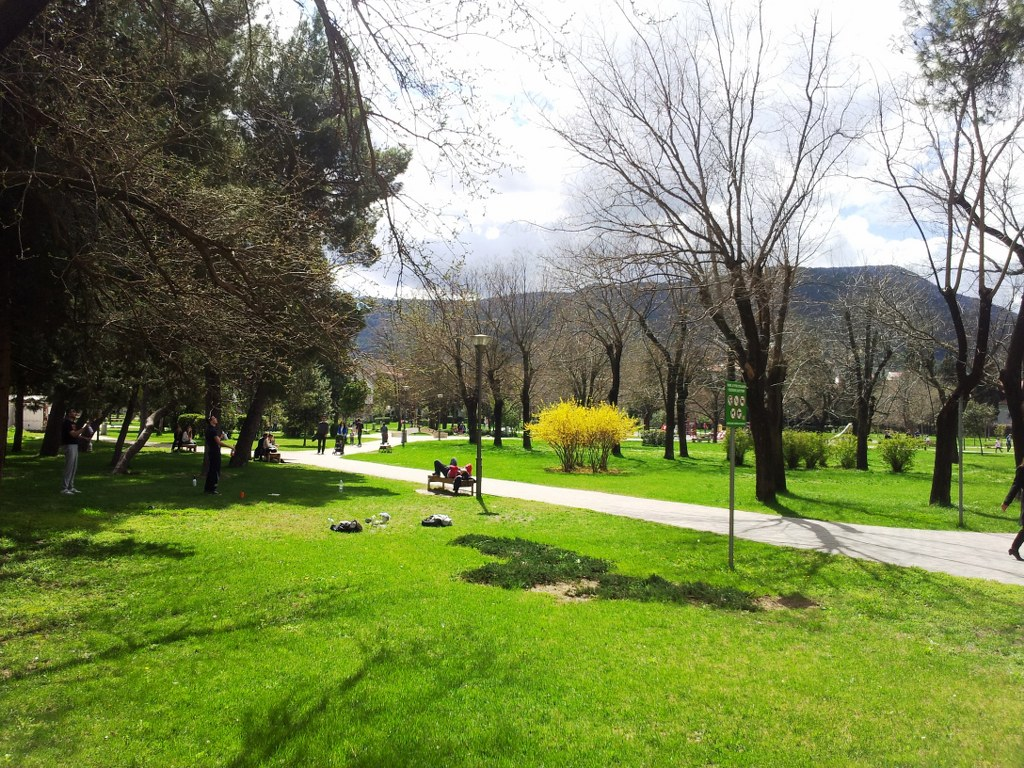
City Park called Zrinjevac in Mostar

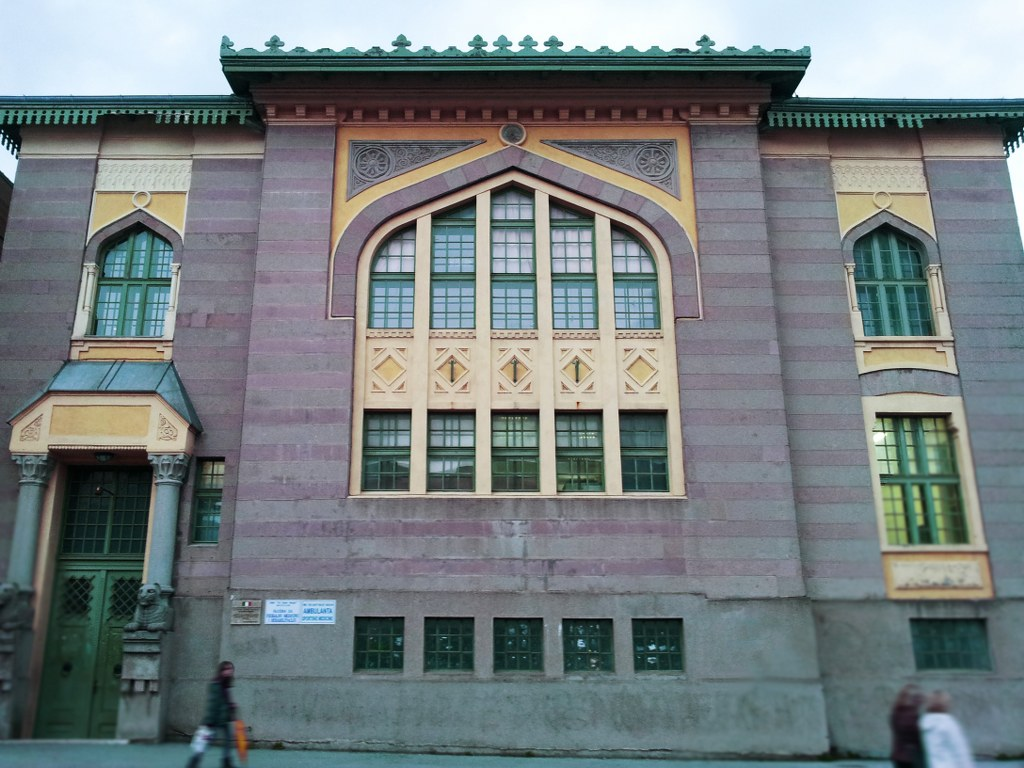
City Bath in Mostar

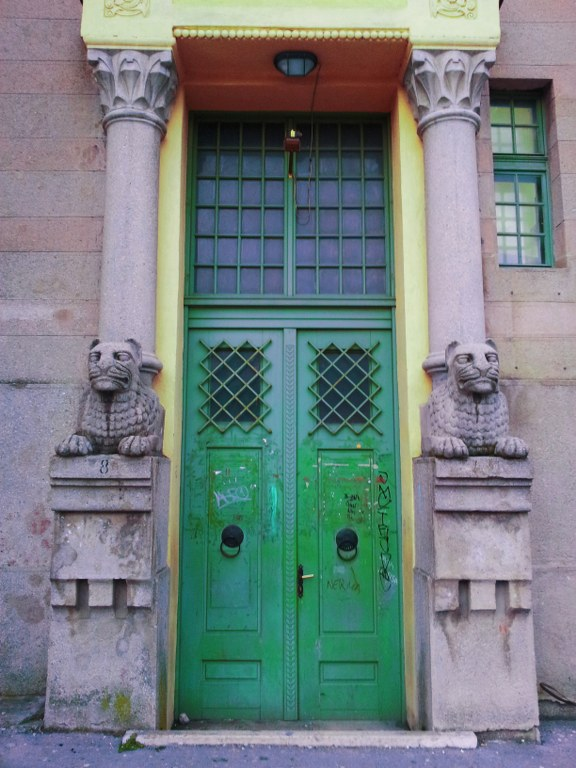
City Bath in Mostar, Entrance

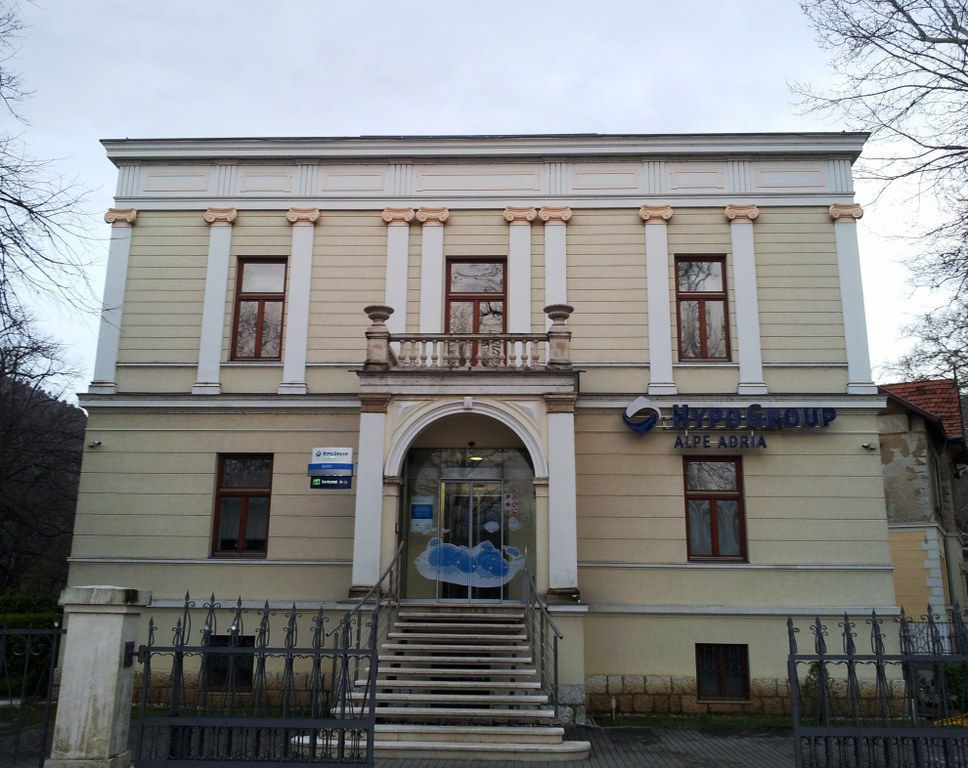
Rondo Square in Mostar

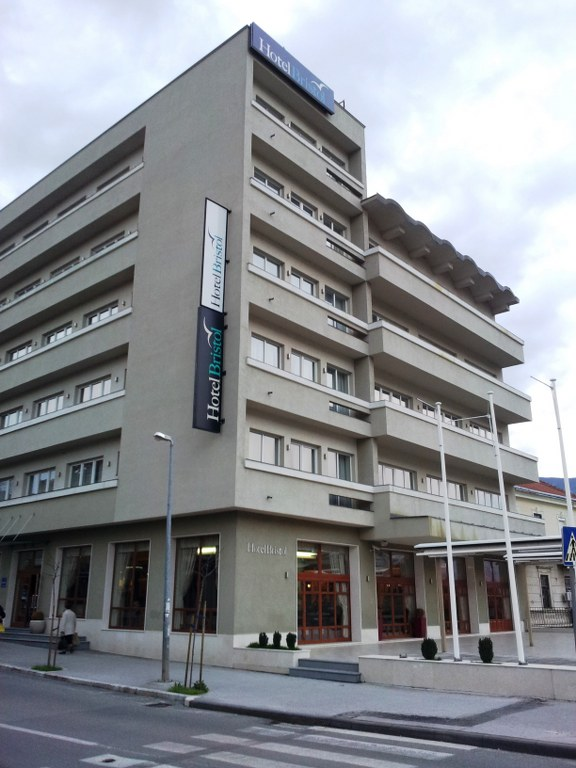
Hotel Bristol in Mostar

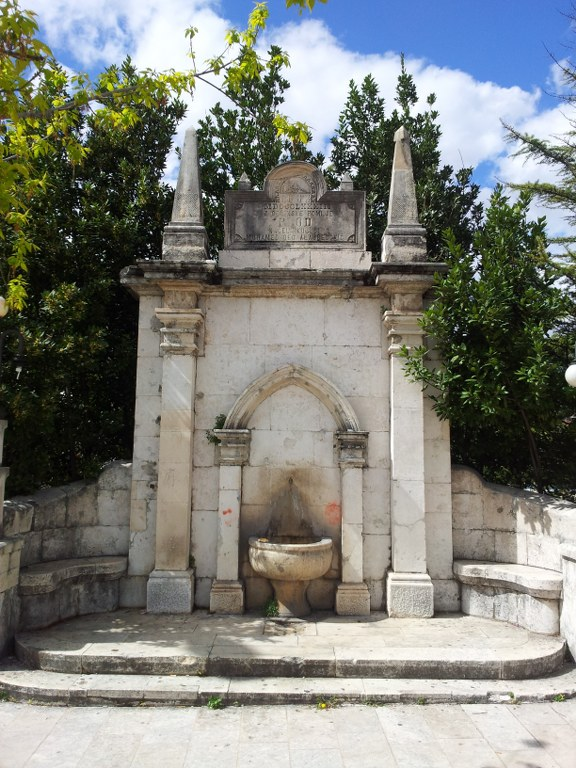
Musala square in Mostar

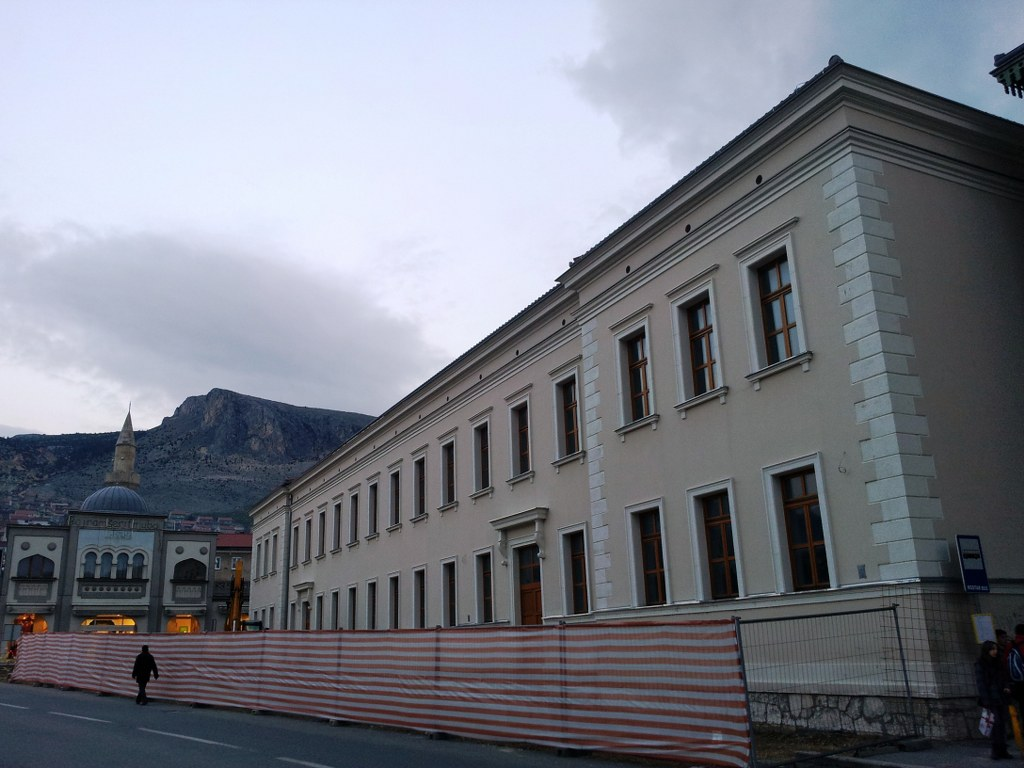
Music school in Musala square in Mostar

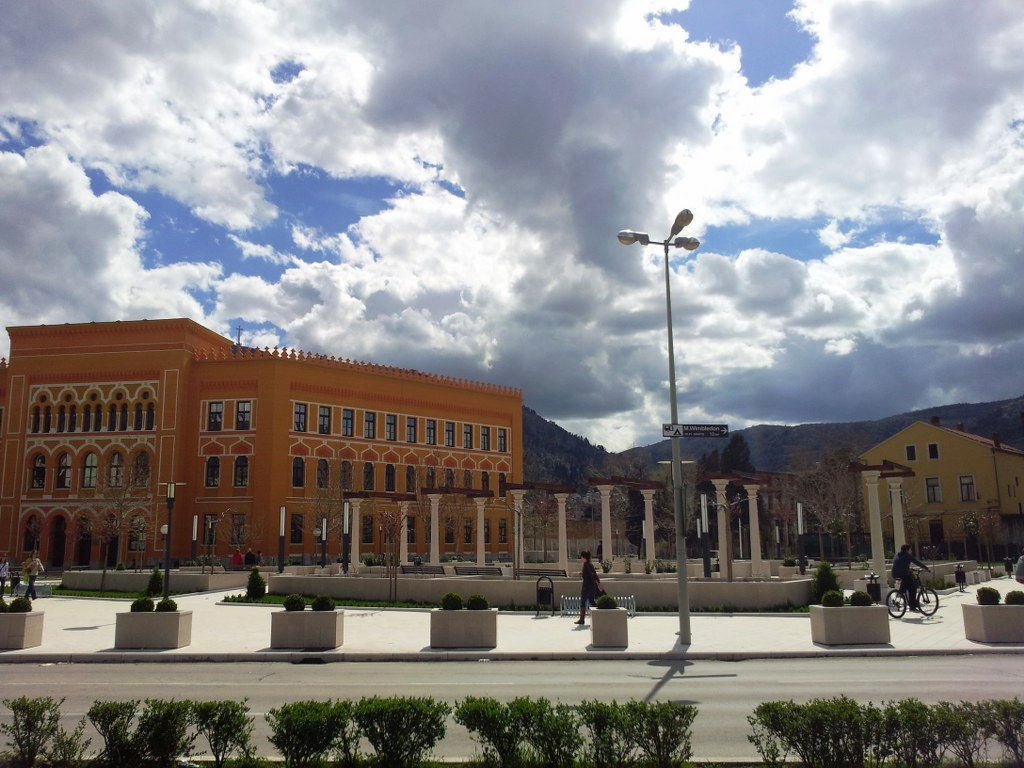
Spanish Square in Mostar

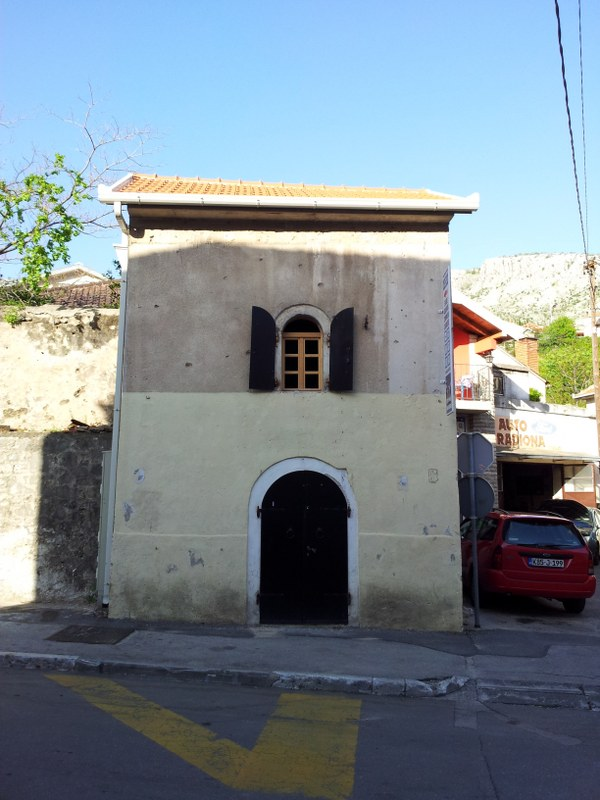
House in the old town, Mostar

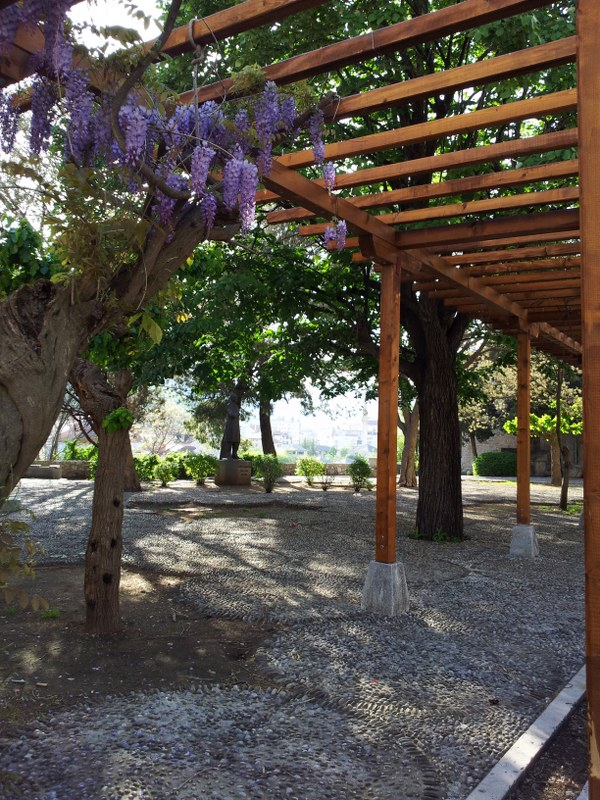
Park in the Old Town, Mostar

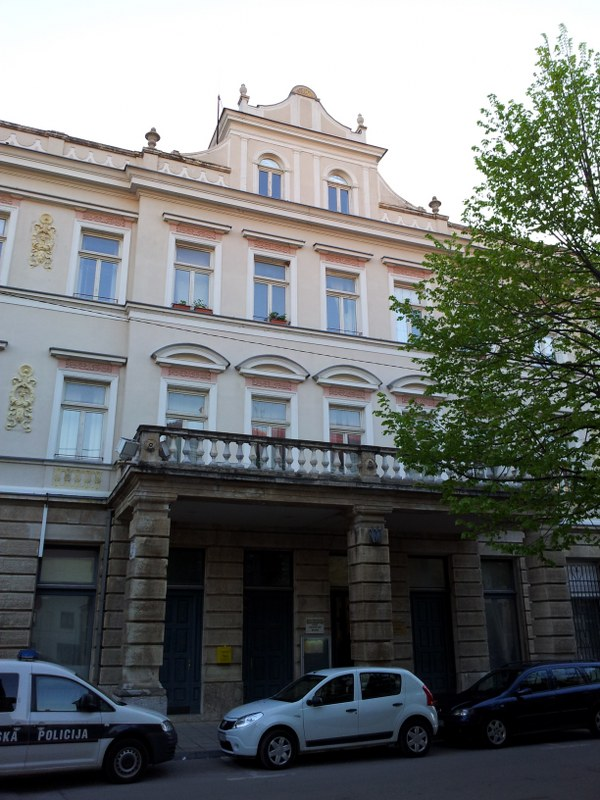
County Court Building in Mostar

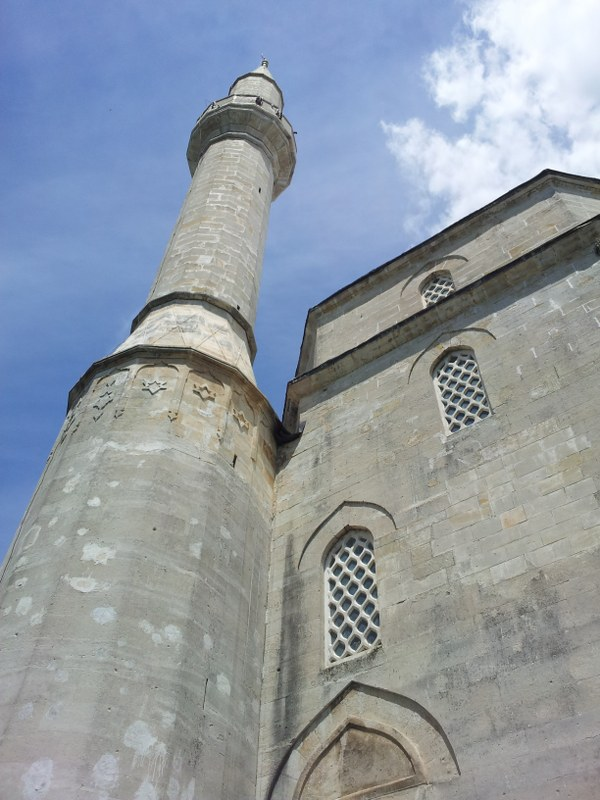
Koski Mehmed Pasha Mosque in Mostar
