= Zálší =

Zálší may refer to places in the Czech Republic:

- Zálší (Tábor District), a municipality and village in the South Bohemian Region
- Zálší (Ústí nad Orlicí District), a municipality and village in the Pardubice Region
- Zálší, a village and part of Sepekov in the South Bohemian Region
