= František Blažek =

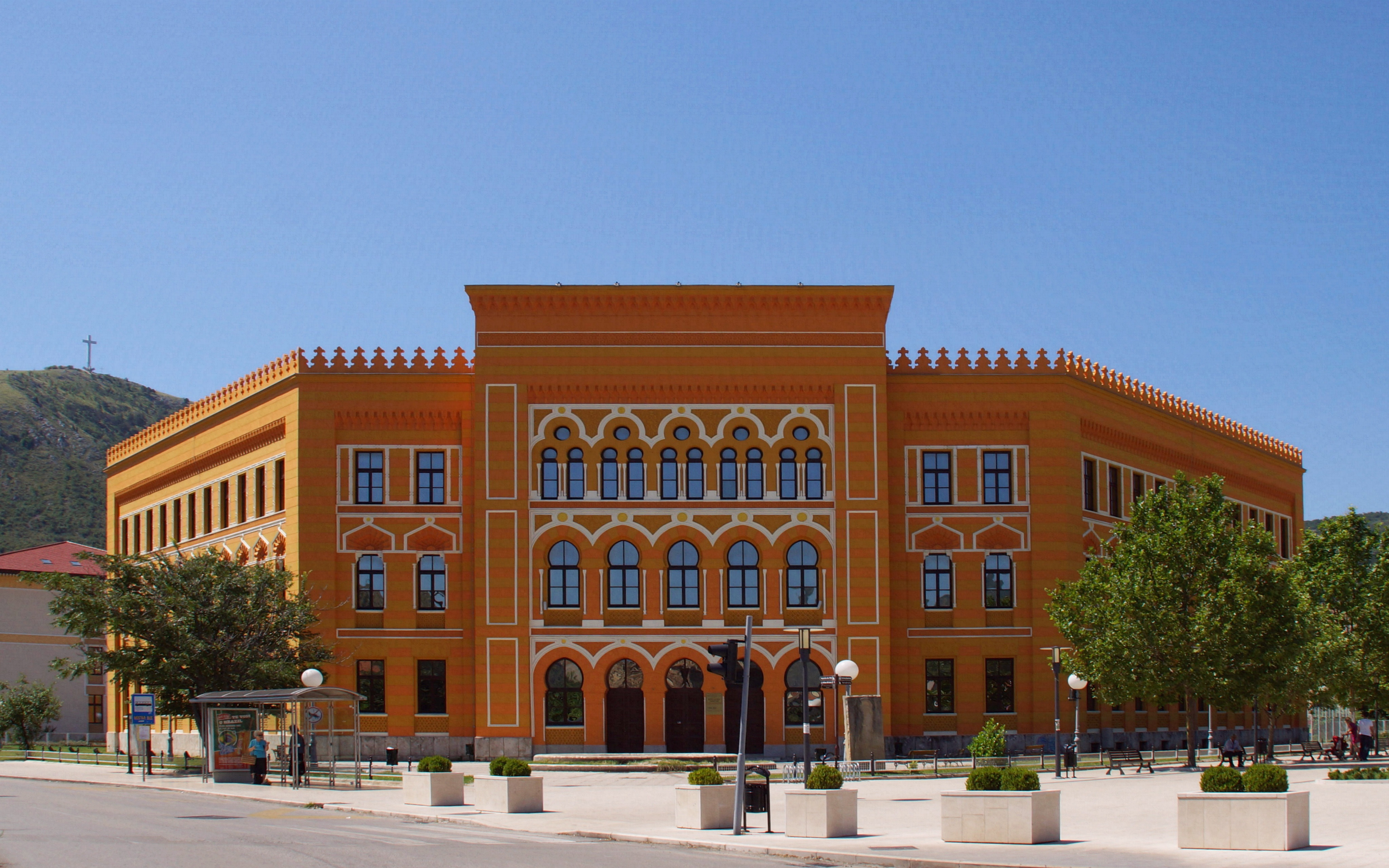
Mostar Gymnasium from 1902 built in Moorish Revival style

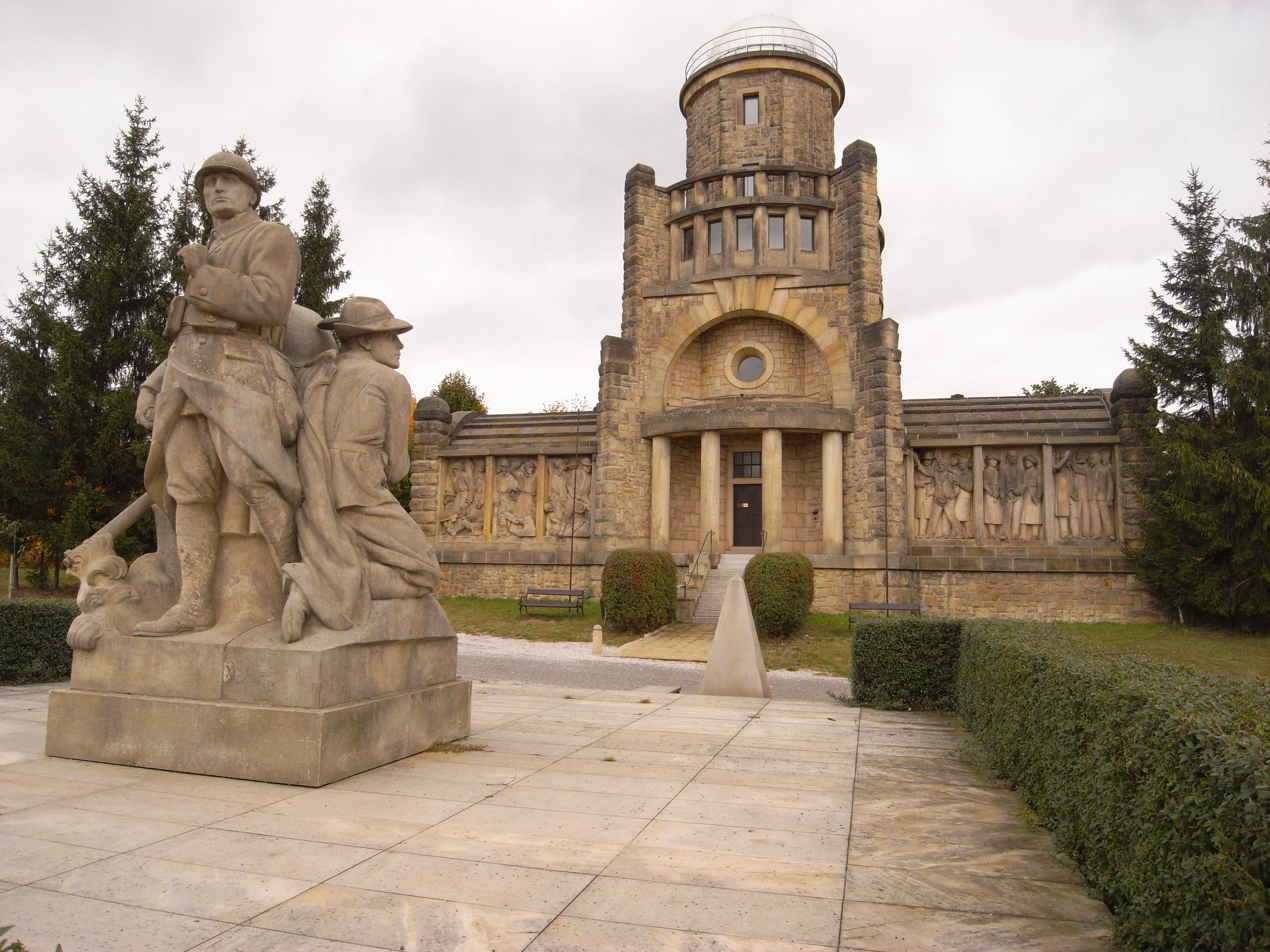
Masaryk Independence Tower in Hořice, Czech Republic

František Blažek (12 May 1863 – 1 January 1944) was a Czech architect and educator. As an architect, he worked mostly Bosnia and Herzegovina within Austria-Hungary.

== Life ==
Blažek was born on 12 May 1863 in Zálší, Bohemia, Austrian Empire, into the family of a farmer. He was son-in-law of Czech architect Karel Pařík. Until 1902, he worked in Bosnia and Herzegovina, where he designed several buildings. In 1902, Blažek became a professor at the Sculpture and Stonemasonry Secondary School in Hořice, where he taught construction and architectural subjects until 1933.

Blažek died on 1 January 1944 in Prague.

== Work ==
In his work, Blažek liked to use the Moorish Revival style and avoided unnecessary decorations. Some of his noteworthy works include the Mostar Gymnasium, the Masaryk Independence Tower in Hořice, Czech Republic, and the Franz Josef Garrison in Sarajevo (today's Ministry of Defence).

František Blažek also designed three hotels in Sarajevo's suburb of Ilidža near the Vrelo Bosne: hotels Igman, Austria and Bosna. They were completed in 1895.

== Gallery ==
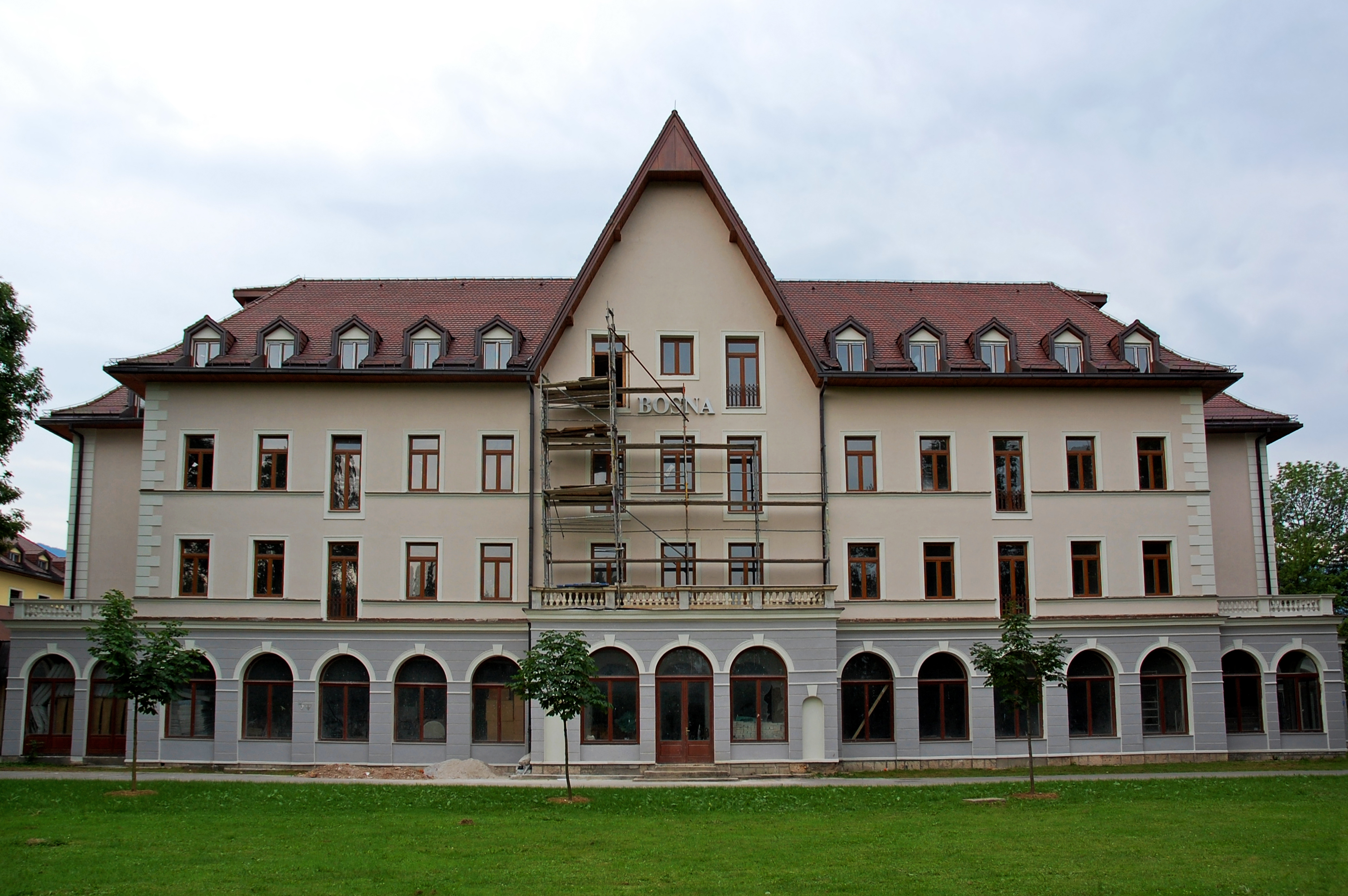
Hotel Bosnia, Ilidža

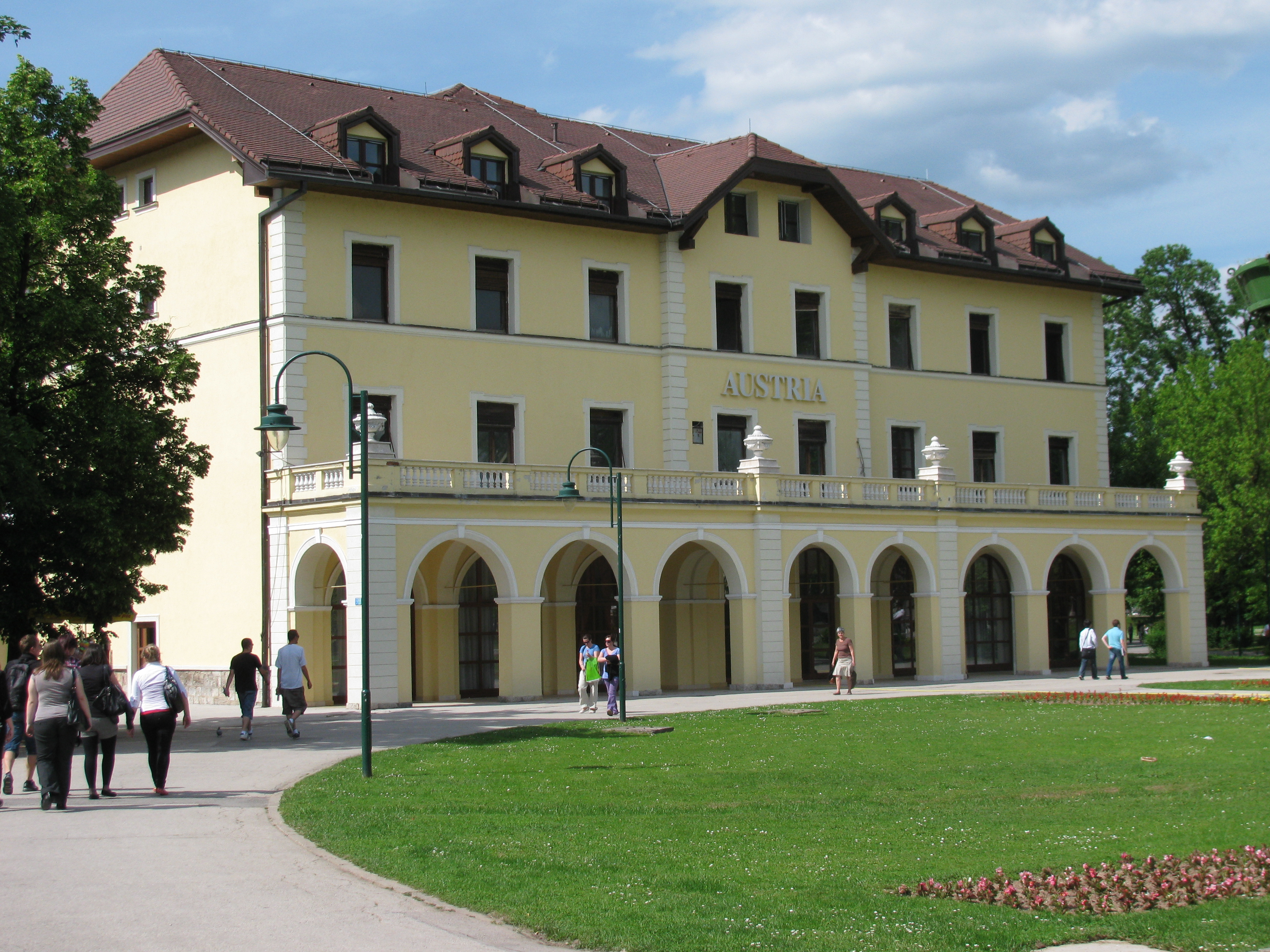
Hotel Austria, Ilidža

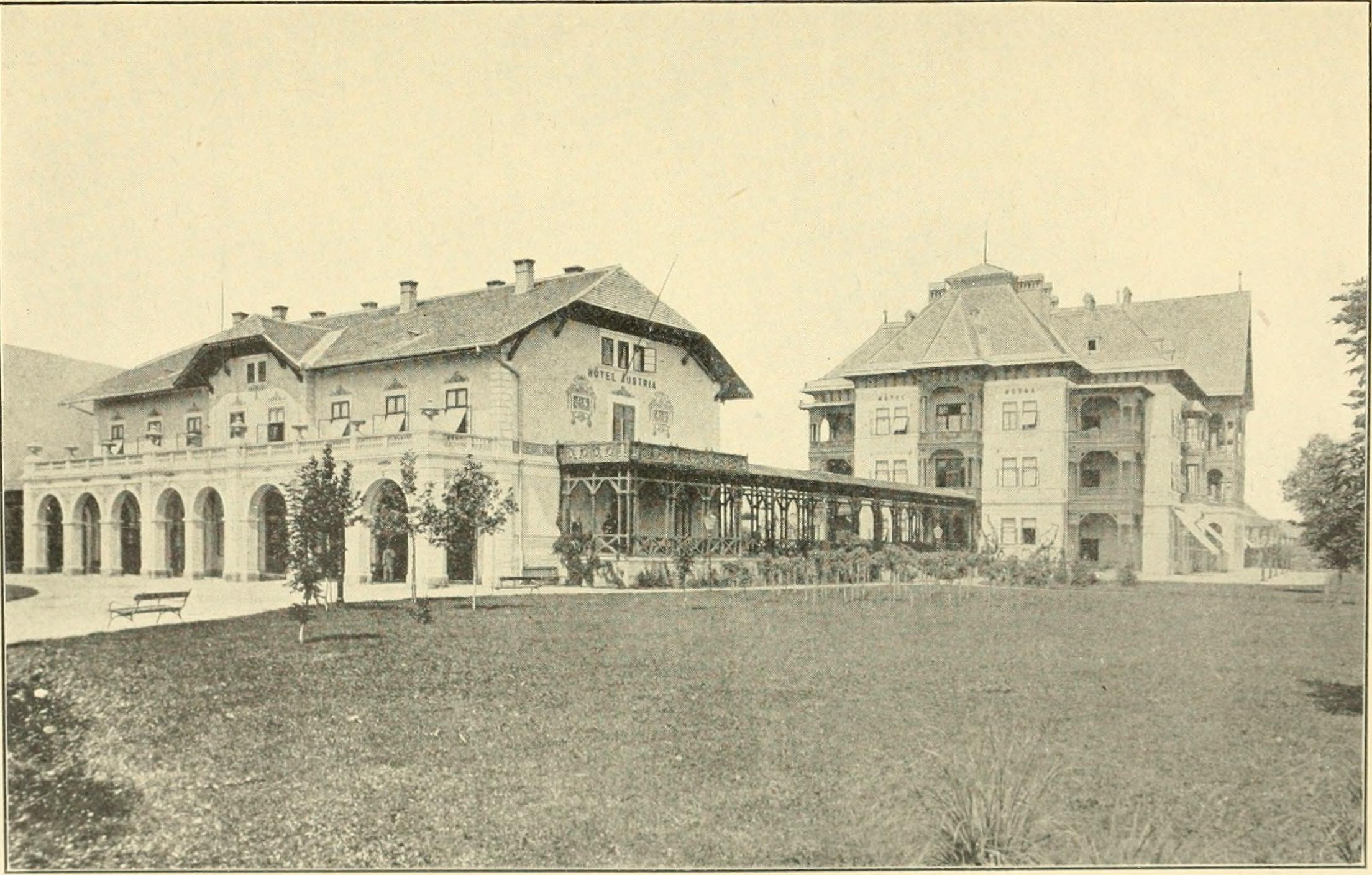
Hotel Austria in 1903

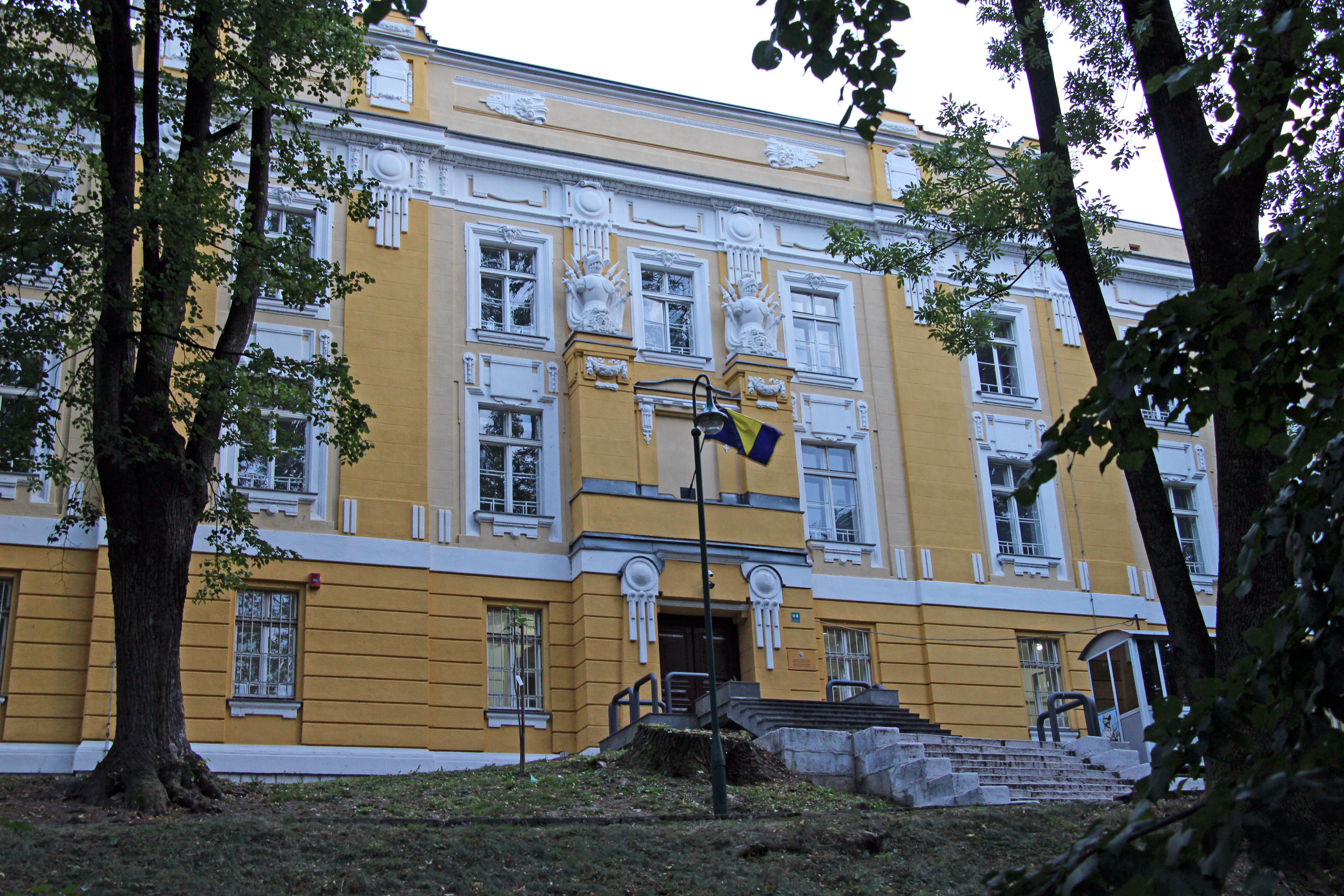
Franz Josef Garrison in Sarajevo, 1898–1901

== See also ==
- Josip Vancaš
- Alexander Wittek
- Juraj Neidhardt
- Architecture of Mostar
