= Zálší (Ústí nad Orlicí District) =

- Municipality
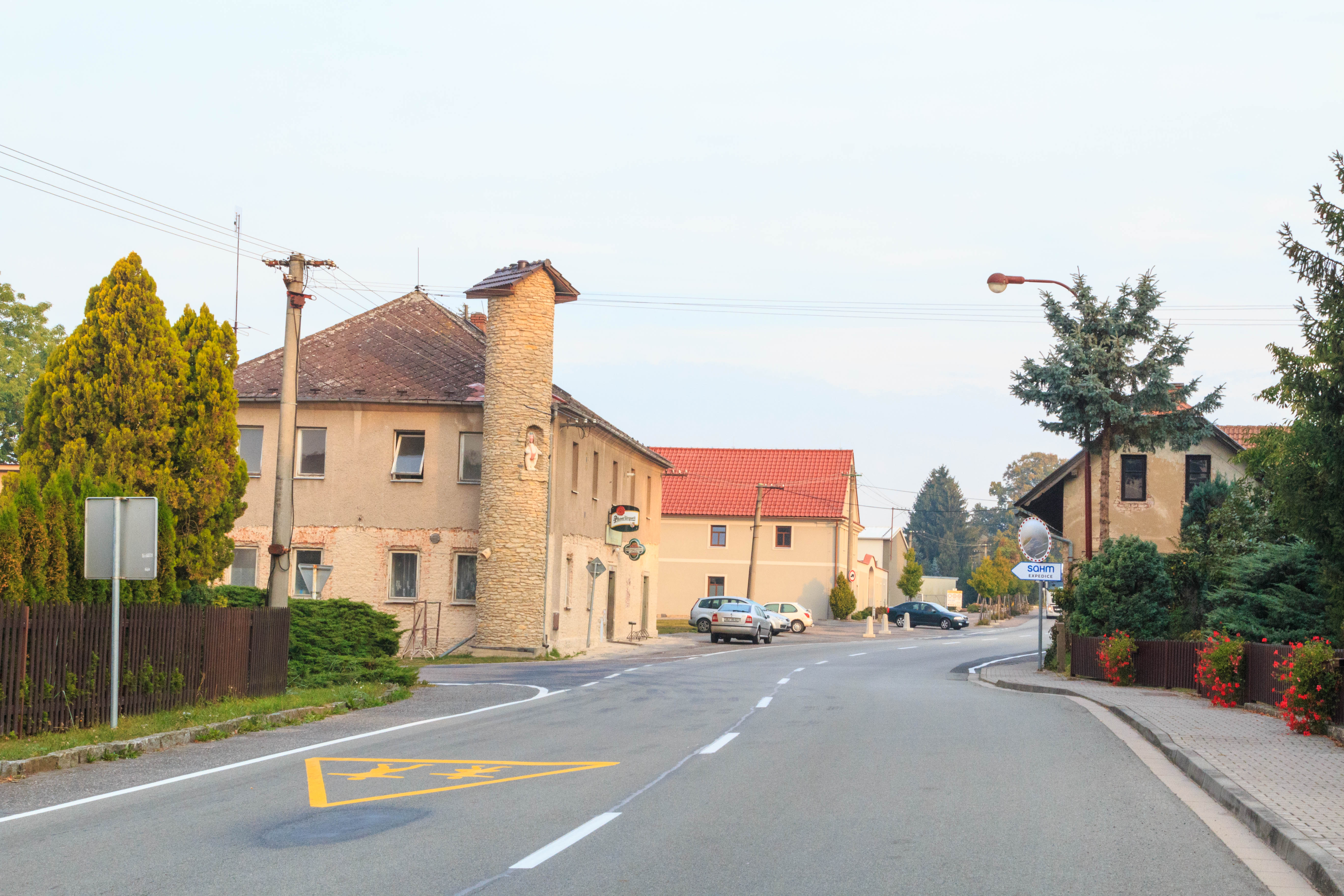
- Main street

- Flag Coat of arms

- Location in the Czech Republic
- Coordinates: 49°57′55″N 16°14′27″E
- Country: Czech Republic
- Region: Pardubice
- District: Ústí nad Orlicí
- First mentioned: 1292

Area
  - Total: 7.73 km^{2} (2.98 sq mi)
- Elevation: 297 m (974 ft)

Population (2026-01-01)
  - Total: 232
  - Density: 30.0/km^{2} (77.7/sq mi)
- Time zone: UTC+1 (CET)
  - Summer (DST): UTC+2 (CEST)
- Postal code: 565 01
- Website: www.obeczalsi.cz

Zálší (German: Zalesch) is a municipality and village in Ústí nad Orlicí District in the Pardubice Region of the Czech Republic. It has about 200 inhabitants.

Zálší lies approximately 12 kilometres (7 mi) west of Ústí nad Orlicí, 35 km (22 mi) east of Pardubice, and 131 km (81 mi) east of Prague.

== Administrative division ==
Zálší consists of two municipal parts (in brackets population according to the 2021 census):

- Zálší (167)
- Nořín (67)

== Demographics ==
Historical population
Year	Pop.	±%
1869	405	—
1880	426	+5.2%
1890	420	−1.4%
1900	406	−3.3%
1910	398	−2.0%
1921	404	+1.5%
1930	349	−13.6%
1950	269	−22.9%
1961	272	+1.1%
1970	262	−3.7%
1980	256	−2.3%
1991	255	−0.4%
2001	236	−7.5%
2011	235	−0.4%
2021	234	−0.4%
Source: Censuses

== Notable people ==
- František Blažek (1863–1944), architect
