= Mustafa Mujaga Komadina =

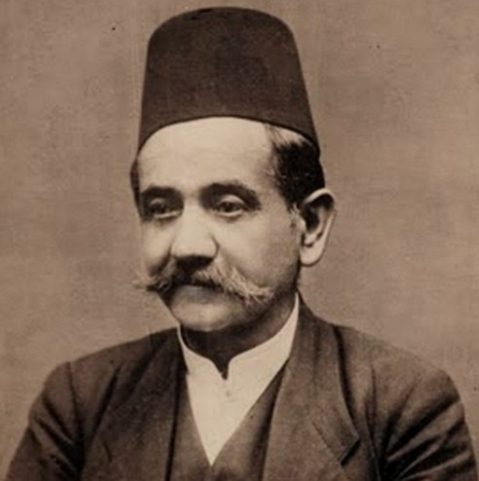
Mujaga Komadina circa 1890

Mustafa Komadina (1839 – 6 May 1925) was a business and political figure from Mostar, Bosnia and Herzegovina. He served as mayor of Mostar from 1909 to 1918. Under his supervision many modern buildings were constructed and it came to look like a Central European city.

== History ==
Komadina was a successful businessman and occasionally offered to finance projects with his personal funds.

Mustafa Komadina was born in Mostar in "Husein-hodža mahala" in today's Carina neighborhood. He was educated in maktab and at madrasas, and spoke fluent Turkish and German.

Mustafa loved to read and owned a large library which contained mostly the works in Turkish. He was among the founders of Mostar's "Volunteer fire department" from 1885 where he invested fifty florins.

At the end of Ottoman rule in the city, Mostar had two public baths. Mustafa was delighted with a bath he saw in Budapest and in May 1911 he proposed a bathhouse project to district authorities in Mostar. A drawing was made by a Mostar native, Miroslav Loose, the then manager of the municipal water supply. On Mustafa's recommendation, the Council sent Loose abroad to study public bathhouses. Mostar Bathhouse opened on 3 June 1914. The brief speech was recorded as: "Folks, here's the bathhouse for those who have money, for those who don't, here's Neretva".

Mujaga visited Italy on 7 April 1925, twenty-nine days prior to his death on 6 May. He was buried at the Lakišić mosque in Ričina neighborhood.

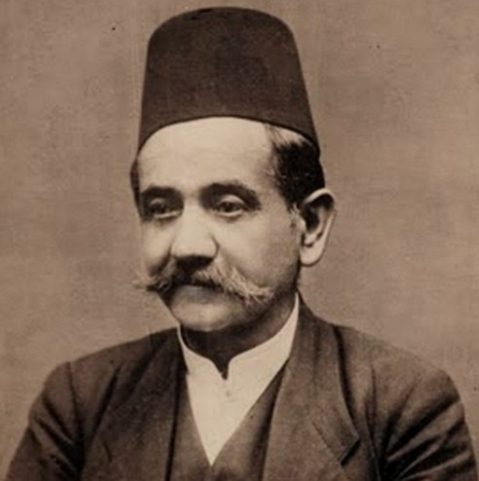
Mujaga Komadina circa 1890

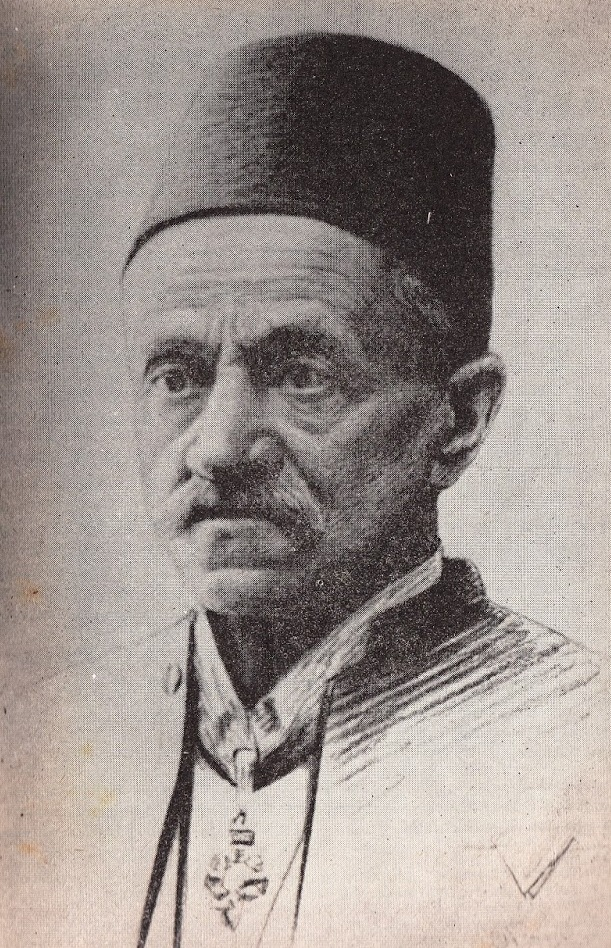
Mujaga Komadina circa 1910

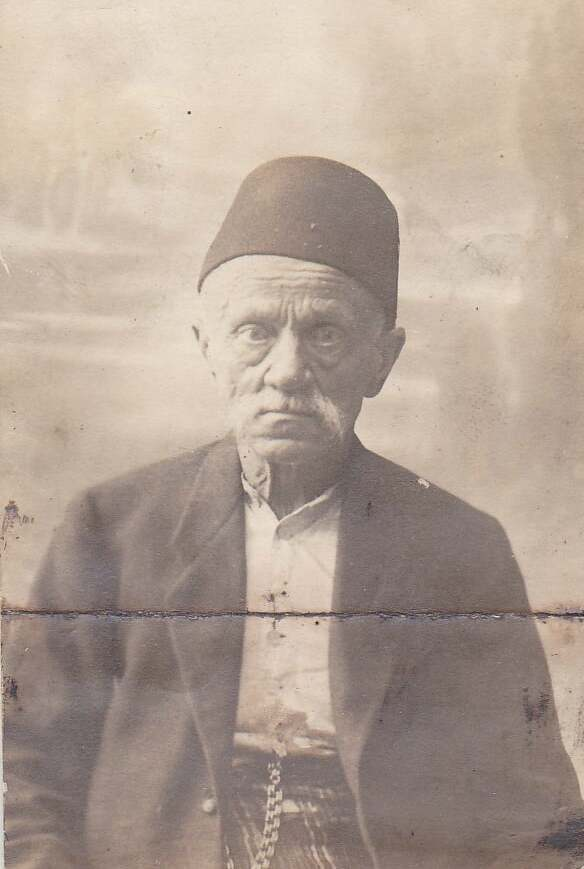
Mujaga Komadina in 1921

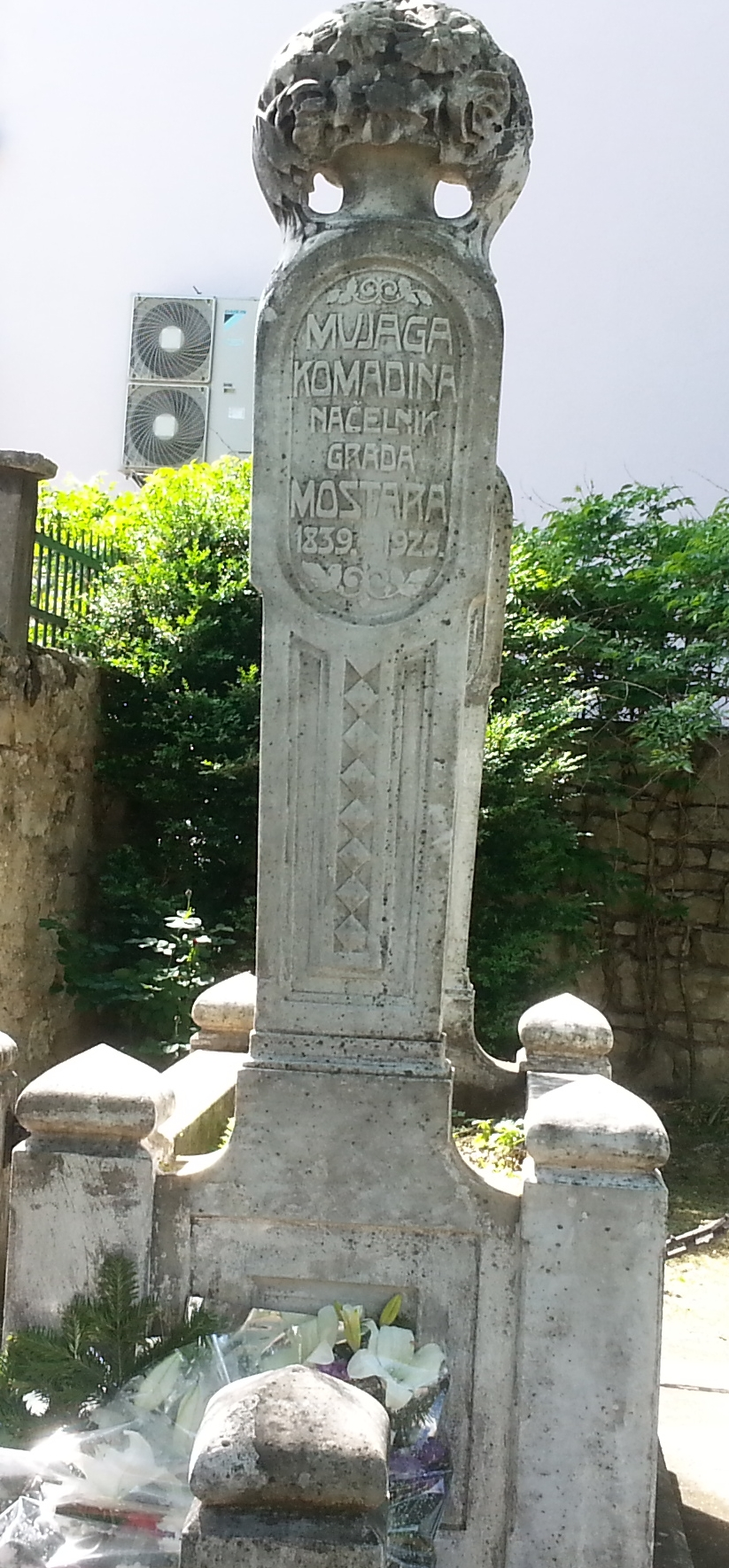
Mujaga Komadina's grave in the courtyard of Lakišić Mosque in Mostar
