= Bosnian Americans =

Americans of Bosnian and/or Herzegovinian birth or descent

Bosanski Amerikanci
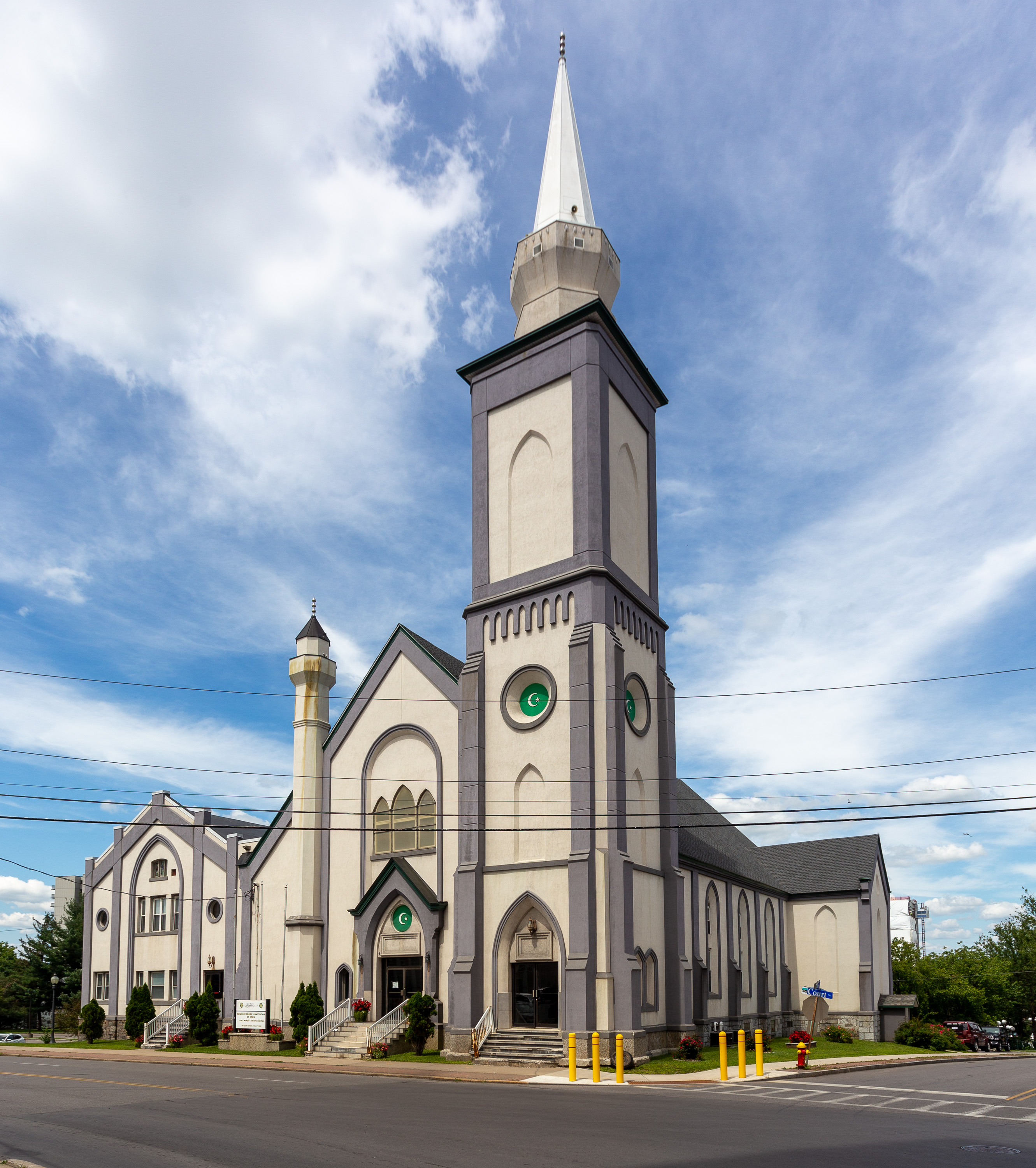
- Bosnian Islamic Association of Utica, New York

Total population
- 350,000 (2014)

Regions with significant populations
- New York City Metropolitan Area, Greater St. Louis, Missouri; Chicagoland, Jacksonville, Florida, Utica, New York, Des Moines, Iowa; Salt Lake County, Utah; San Jose and Silicon Valley, California, Metro Detroit, Kentucky, Phoenix, Tampa, Florida, New Orleans, Louisiana, Houston, Texas, Dallas, Texas

Languages
- American English · Bosnian

Religion
- Sunni Islam

Related ethnic groups
- Bosnian Canadians, Serbian Americans, Croatian Americans, European Americans, Yugoslav Americans

Bosnian Americans (Bosnian: Bosanski Amerikanci) are Americans whose ancestry can be traced to Bosnia and Herzegovina. Bosnian immigration to the United States began as early as the 19th century, but the majority of Bosnian Americans immigrated to the United States during and after the 1992–1995 Bosnian War. Most are Bosnian Muslims, or Bosniaks.

As of 2020 there are some 350,000 Americans of Bosnian descent living in the country. The largest Bosnian-American population can be found in both Greater St. Louis and in Greater Chicago which boast the largest number of Bosnians in the world outside of Europe.

== History ==
=== Early period ===
The first Bosnians settled in Chicago in the late 19th and early 20th centuries, joining other immigrants seeking better opportunities and better lives. As the former Yugoslavia continued to find its identity as a nation over the last century, the people of Bosnia and Herzegovina sought stability and new beginnings in the city of Chicago, many intending to return to their homeland. Those who were of the Islamic faith were early leaders in the establishment of Chicago's Islamic community. In 1906, they established the Dzemijetul Hajrije (The Benevolent Society) of Illinois to preserve the community's religious and national traditions, as well as to provide mutual assistance for funerals and illnesses. The organization established branches in Gary, Indiana, in 1913, and Butte, Montana, in 1916, and is the oldest existing Islamic organization in the United States.

=== Post World War II ===
Chicago's Bosnian community received a new influx of migrants after World War II who were displaced by the war and the communist takeover of Yugoslavia. This new wave of refugees included many well-educated professionals, some of whom were forced to take low-skilled jobs as taxi cab drivers, factory workers, chauffeurs, and janitors. As the population increased in the early 1950s, the Muslim community invited Shaykh Kamil Avdich (Ćamil Avdić), a prominent Muslim scholar, to become the first permanent imam (religious minister). Under Imam Kamil's leadership, the Bosnian Muslim Religious and Cultural Home was established to raise funds for a mosque, which opened on Halsted Street in 1957. In 1968, the organization's name was changed to the Bosnian American Cultural Association, and in the early 1970s it purchased land in Northbrook to build a larger mosque and cultural center. The Islamic Cultural Center of Greater Chicago has remained an important center for Bosnian Muslim religious activity, serving Bosnians and non-Bosnian Muslims in the Chicago metropolitan area.

=== Bosnian War (1992–1995) ===
The war in Bosnia and Herzegovina from 1992 to 1995 brought the largest influx of Bosnians to St. Louis, which became the most popular United States destination for Bosnian refugees. It is estimated that 40,000 refugees moved to the St. Louis area in the 1990s and early 2000s, bringing the total St. Louis Bosnian population to some 70,000. In Chicago, the Bosnian community has largely settled in the northern part of the city, between Lawrence and Howard, from Clark to Lake Michigan. Many refugees suffered from post-traumatic stress disorder as a result of gruesome experiences in concentration camps and the death of family and friends. The Illinois Department of Human Services founded the Bosnian Refugee Center in 1994 with the help of public and private agencies to assist the newcomers, and in 1997 it became the nonprofit Bosnian & American Community Center. Staffed by Bosnian refugees from all backgrounds, the center serves all refugees by providing community services that include educational and family programs, counseling, and cultural activities.

== Demography ==
The largest Bosnian-American communities in the US are found in St. Louis (Bevo Mill's "Little Bosnia"); followed by Chicago, Jacksonville, New York City, Detroit and Houston. Atlanta has Georgia's largest Bosnian-American community with over 10,000 in the metro area, most of whom can be found in Gwinnett County's Lawrenceville. An estimated 10,000 Bosnians live in Phoenix, Arizona. 36.8% of the residents of Utica, New York report having Bosnian ancestry. Several small suburban towns in Missouri contain a Bosnian-born population that surpasses 10% of its population (not including those born in the U.S. or born in another country of Bosnian descent). There is a growing Bosnian community in Bowling Green, Kentucky. There is a Bosnian community in San Jose, California and the surrounding Silicon Valley region. There is also a Bosnian Muslim Roma community in St. Louis.

Population counts are complicated by historical and ethnic factors. Immigrants from before the breakup of Yugoslavia would have been identified only as Yugoslavs. Bosnian Croat or Bosnian Serb immigrants may identify solely as Croatian or Serbian.

According to estimates from the American Community Survey for 2015–2019, there were 103,900 immigrants from Bosnia and Herzegovina. The top counties of residence were:

County	State	Population
Cook County	Illinois	7,100
Saint Louis County	Missouri	6,400
Polk County	Iowa	4,000
Maricopa County	Arizona	3,200
Duval County	Florida	2,800
Oneida County	New York	2,500
Macomb County	Michigan	2,400
Pinellas County	Florida	2,300
Kent County	Michigan	2,100
Gwinnett County	Georgia	2,100
Hartford County	Connecticut	2,000
Black Hawk County	Iowa	1,700
Santa Clara County	California	1,600
Warren County	Kentucky	1,500
Jefferson County	Kentucky	1,500

== Politics ==
The early Bosnian-American community were generally inactive in domestic American politics. In the 2010s, Bosnian Americans became more active in politics and activism. In recent local and national elections, Bosnian Americans have mainly backed the Democratic Party due to the party's outreach efforts towards the community, support for Bosnia and Herzegovina, and support for religious and racial diversity. In the 2016 presidential election, the majority of Bosnian Americans expressed support for Hillary Clinton and disapproval of Donald Trump due to his anti-Muslim rhetoric, anti-immigration views, and his popularity with Serbian nationalists.

== Impact of U.S. Anti-Muslim Prejudice on Bosnian Americans ==
Initially, Bosnian refugees in America faced many issues like adjusting to American life, struggling mental health, and access to quality healthcare. While Bosnian Americans still face significant social issues, the community is considered to be proactive and have positively impacted their local communities via economic contributions, charity, and outreach.

While Muslim Bosnian Americans may not directly encounter Islamophobia due to their European appearance, as non-Muslim Americans often misassociate Islam with darker-skinned people, they are still often negatively affected by anti-Muslim prejudice, especially if they wear a hijab or mention their religious identity.

== Organizations ==
- Bosnian diaspora
- Bosnian-Herzegovinian Film Festival
- Bostel
- Zambak

== See also ==
- Yugoslav Americans
- European Americans
- Bosnia and Herzegovina–United States relations
- Bosnians in Chicago
- Bosnian-American Islamic Cultural Center in Hartford, Connecticut
- History of Bosnian Americans in St. Louis
- List of Bosnian Americans
