= Peter Matthews =

Peter Matthews or Mathews may refer to:

- Peter Matthews (rebel) (1789–1838), hanged for treason in 1838 after the Upper Canada Rebellion
- Peter Matthews (sprinter) (born 1989), Jamaican sprinter
- Peter H. Matthews (1873–1916), American operator of policy gambling
- Peter Matthews (police officer) (1917–2003), British Chief Constable
- Peter Hugoe Matthews (1934–2023), British linguist
- Peter Matthews (printmaker) (born 1942), British printmaker
- Peter Mathews (archaeologist) (born 1951), Australian Mayanist
- Peter Matthews (physiologist) (1928–2020), British physiologist
- Peter Mathews (politician) (1951–2017), Irish politician
- Peter Mathews (Left Behind), fictional character in Left Behind
- Peter Matthews (artist) (born 1978), English artist
- Peter Mathews Memorial Skate Garden, a skatepark named in honor of a local skater who died
