= Dutchtown, St. Louis =

Neighborhood of St. Louis in Missouri, US

Coordinates: 38.5812°N 90.2465°W

Dutchtown
- Neighborhood of St. Louis
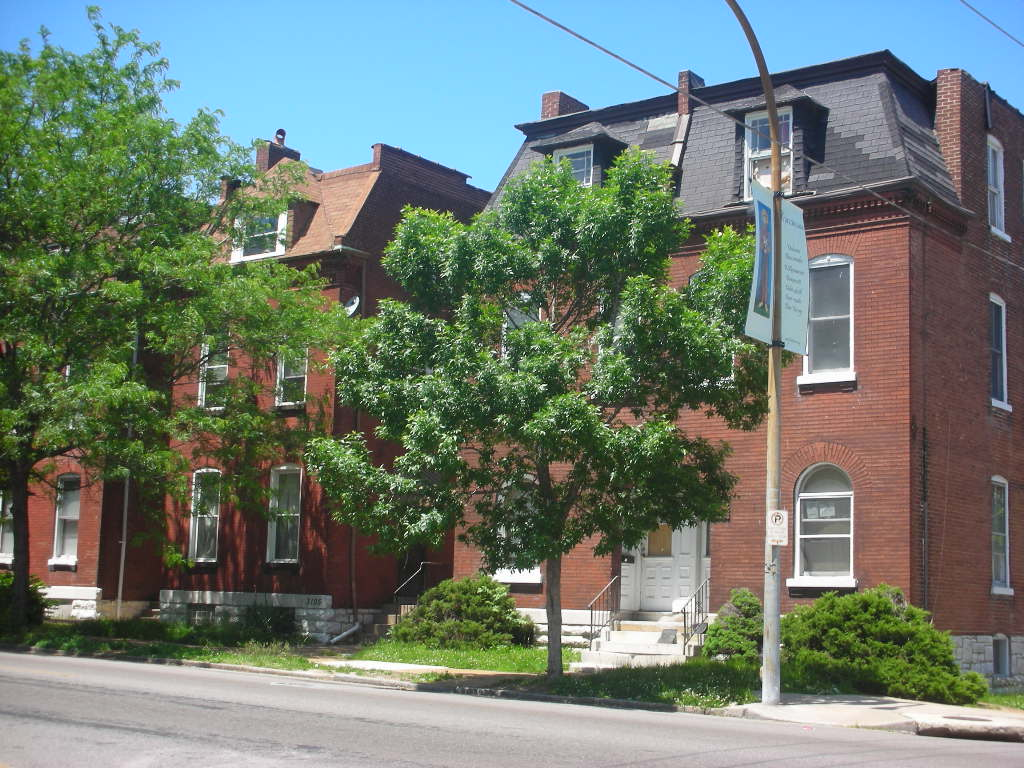
- Private residences in Dutchtown, houses of locally made brick

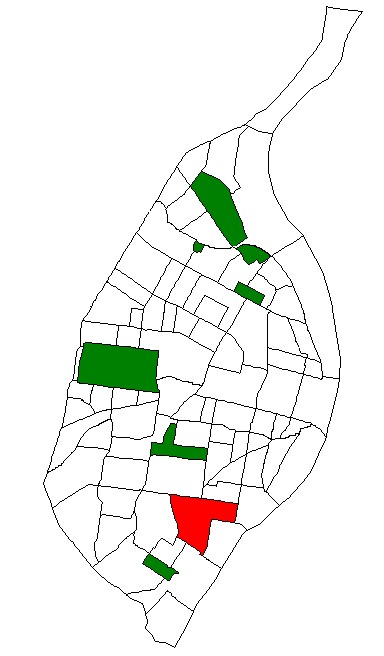
- Location (red) of Dutchtown within St. Louis
- Country: United States
- State: Missouri
- City: St. Louis
- Wards: 9, 13, 15, 20, 25

Area
  - Total: 1.52 sq mi (3.9 km^{2})

Population (2020)
  - Total: 15,356
  - Density: 10,100/sq mi (3,900/km^{2})
- ZIP code(s): Parts of 63111, 63116, 63118
- Area code(s): 314
- Website: DutchtownSTL.org

Dutchtown is a neighborhood of St. Louis, Missouri. It is called "Dutch" from Deutsch, i.e., "German", as it was the southern center of German-American settlement in St. Louis in the early 19th century. It was the original site of Concordia Seminary (before it relocated to Clayton, Missouri), Concordia Publishing House, Lutheran Hospital, and other German community organizations. The German Cultural Society still has its headquarters there. St Anthony of Padua Catholic Church towers over the neighborhood and is a symbol of the neighborhood.

While the influence of the German settlers remains, Dutchtown rapidly began to diversify in the 1990s. Half of Dutchtown residents today are Black, and significant numbers of Latinos, Asians, and other immigrants call the neighborhood home as well.

A number of resale shops and boutiques have clustered in the Downtown Dutchtown area along Meramec Street between South Grand Boulevard and Compton Avenue.

The 17-acre Marquette Park sits in the center of the neighborhood and features a free public swimming pool, recreation center, playground, tennis courts, a renovated field house, and plenty of green space. Other parks in Dutchtown include Amberg Park at the west end of the neighborhood, and Laclede Park and Minnie Wood Memorial Square to the east.

== Demographics ==
In 2020, the neighborhood was 50.7% Black, 26.0% White, 7.0% Asian, 0.5% Native American, 0% Native Hawaiian and Pacific Islander, 8.3% Two or More Races, and 7.3% Some Other Race. 12.1% of the population was of Hispanic or Latino origin.

Historical population
Year	Pop.	±%
1990	17,943	—
2000	17,222	−4.0%
2010	15,770	−8.4%
2020	15,356	−2.6%

== Marquette Park ==
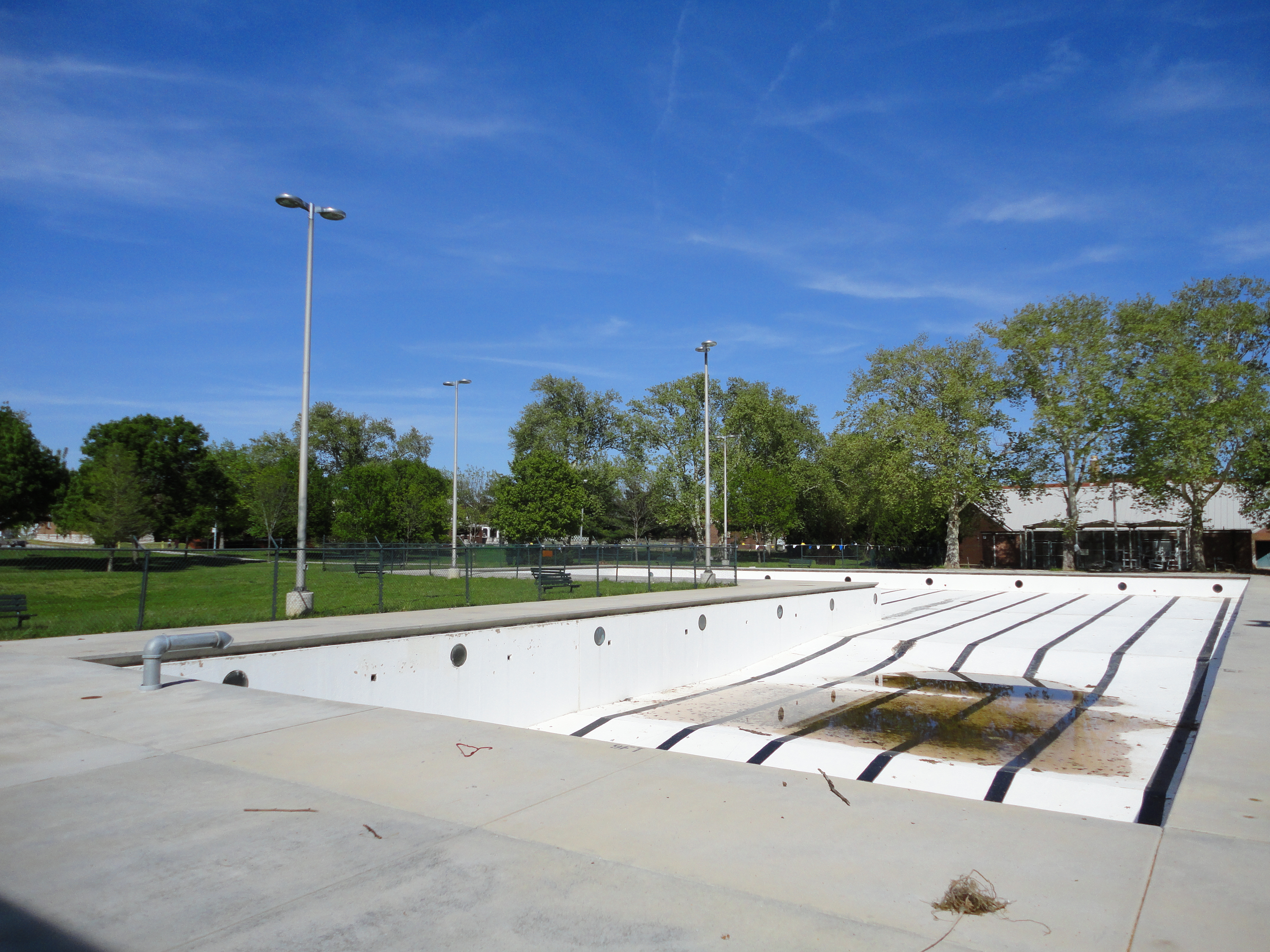
Marquette Park Pool in 2011

Marquette Park is a historic park in Dutchtown It is home to a recreation center and the historic Marquette Park Pool. The park was named after Father Pere Marquette in 1915 and covers 17 acres (6.9 ha).

Father Pere Marquette (a Jesuit priest) and Louis Jolliet were the first Europeans to explore and map the northern portion of the Mississippi River. The park is on the site of the House of Refuge orphanage. The pool was renovated and reopened the summer of 2015.

== See also ==
- Anzeiger des Westens, a German-American newspaper of St. Louis, that for a time in the 1840s had the largest circulation of any paper in Missouri
- Bevo Mill, the neighborhood to the west, that was also German, and has now become a major settlement of Bosnians
- Gravois Park, a neighborhood north of Dutchtown
- Missouri Rhineland, the area that pioneered the production of local German style wines and German settlement of Missouri
- Tower Grove South, a large neighborhood to the north of Dutchtown
- Westliche Post, a later St. Louis German daily paper, where Joseph Pulitzer (who would later buy it and merge it to form the Post-Dispatch) started
