= St. Louis Islamic Center =

Bosnian Islamic organization in St. Louis, United States

Coordinates: 38°32′09″N 90°19′24″W

The St. Louis Islamic Center (STLIC) is a Bosnian Islamic organization and mosque in St. Louis, Missouri, founded in early 2010. STLIC is part of the Islamic Community of North America Bosniaks (ICNAB) and it was founded due to the growing need for organization of the already matured community of Bosniaks in St. Louis. Members of STLIC established an institution that will work, together with other Bosniak institutions, to protect Bosniaks from complete alienation from religion and their tradition, with a specific emphasis on programs that will preserve the youth from complete negative assimilation. It is also focused on the religious and moral regeneration of Bosniaks in St. Louis and further.

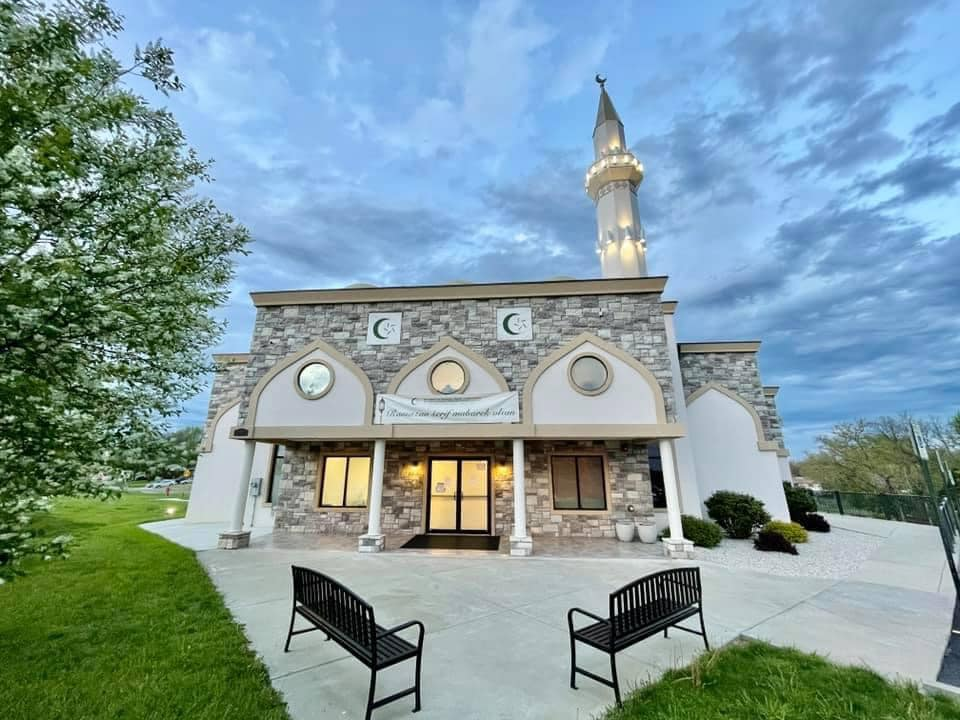
St. Louis Islamic Center - Spring, 2020

== Advisory board ==
The advisory board of St. Louis Islamic Center consists of three individuals whose primary goal is to monitor and as needed correct the work of the Jamaat Board according to civic and religious law. The Jamaat Board is responsible for the day-to-day operations of the St. Louis Islamic Center and consists of seven members.

== Nur Mosque ==
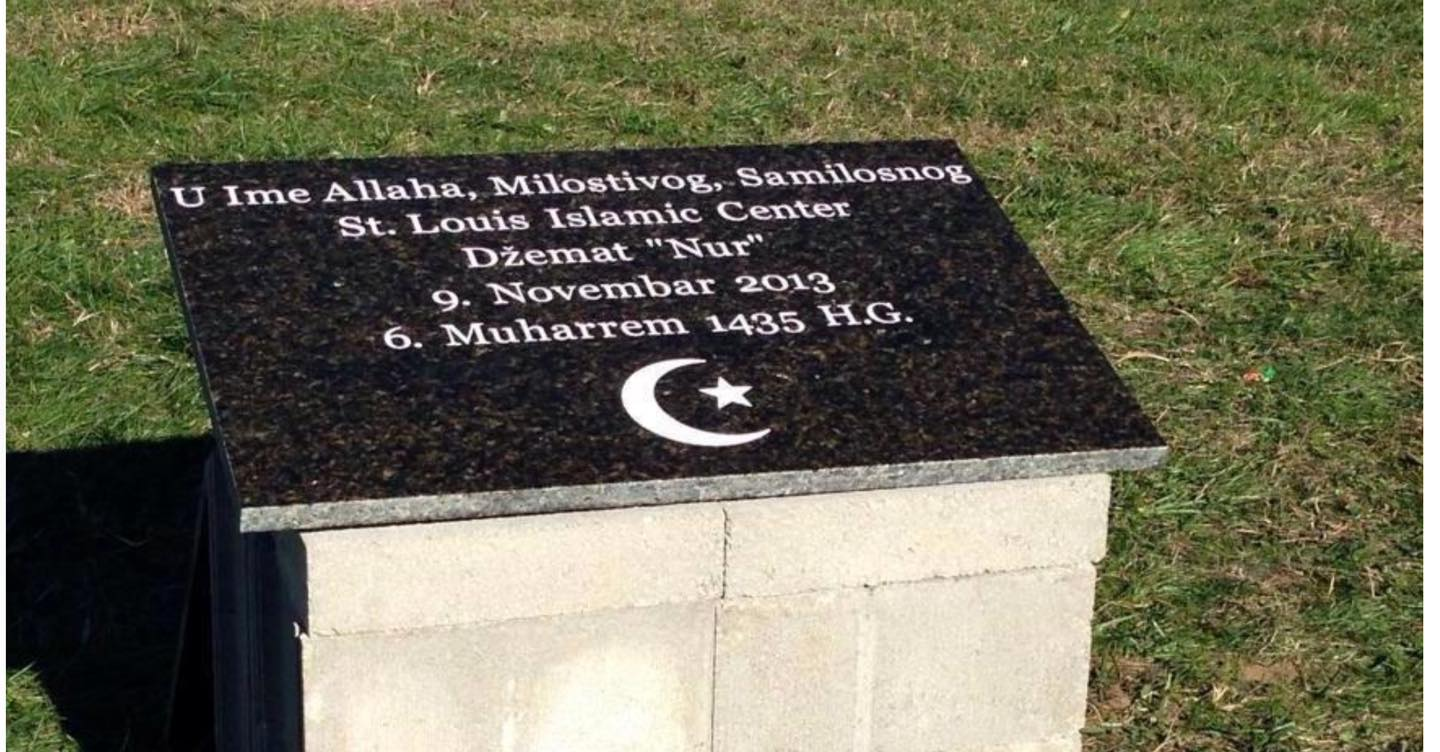
STLIC Dedication Plaque, November 2013

On November 9th, 2013, the St. Louis Islamic Center began the construction of a mosque, the Nur Mosque, in southern St. Louis County. The construction cost 1.5 million dollars, and the mosque opened on April 1, 2017.

== See also ==
- List of mosques in the Americas
- Lists of mosques
- List of mosques in the United States
