= Bostel =

Bosnian language network in North America

RTV BosTel
- Type: Satellite network
- Country: United States
- Availability: United States
- Launch date: 2001
- Official website: RTV BosTel

RTV BosTel (also known as BosTel) is a Bosnian-language broadcaster in North America serving the Bosnian diaspora.

RTV BosTel's programming first began airing in September 2001 with a two-hour radio program in the Chicago radio market. Since then, it has expanded into a 24-hour satellite television network across North America. RTV BosTel currently broadcasts via EURO World Network's satellite platform on Galaxy-19 and is also available on the NexTV America IPTV platform.

BosTel's mission is to connect the displaced Bosnians with their nation, their main focus is helping the community as much as possible.
