= Alexander Wittek =

Austrian-Hungarian architect and chess master

- Born: 12 October 1852; Sisak, Austrian Empire
- Died: 5 November 1894 (aged 41); Graz, Austro-Hungarian Monarchy
- Occupation: Architect

Alexander Wittek (12 October 1852 – 11 May 1894) was an Austrian-Hungarian architect and chess master.

== Career ==
As an architect, Wittek worked in Bosnia and Herzegovina during the Austro-Hungarian Empire. His best-known works in Sarajevo are the City Hall building called "Vijećnica" (1892–1894) which later became the National Library and the Sebilj public fountain (1891), and in Mostar Hotel Neretva, all designed and built in the pseudo-Moorish style.

Wittek was also a chess master. He tied for 5–6th at Berlin 1881 (2nd DSB–Congress, Joseph Henry Blackburne won), and was in 9th place at Vienna 1882 (Wilhelm Steinitz and Simon Winawer won). In 1882 he was ranked 9th in the world.

== Death ==
Wittek died in a lunatic asylum in Graz in 1894, having been diagnosed with a "paralytic mental disorder" the previous year. One source says that he committed suicide but another cites tuberculosis.

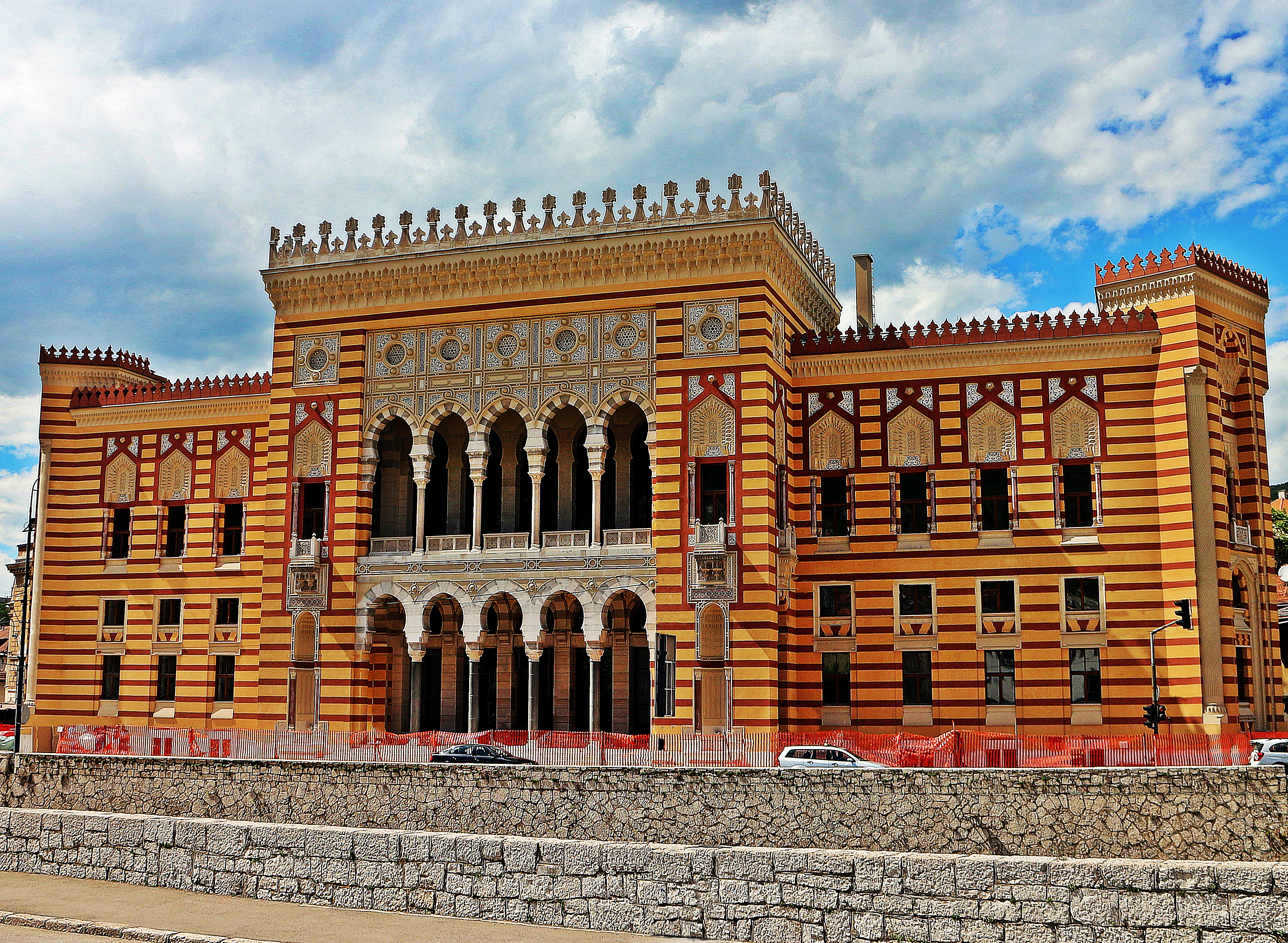
National and University Library of Bosnia and Herzegovina (1891-1896)

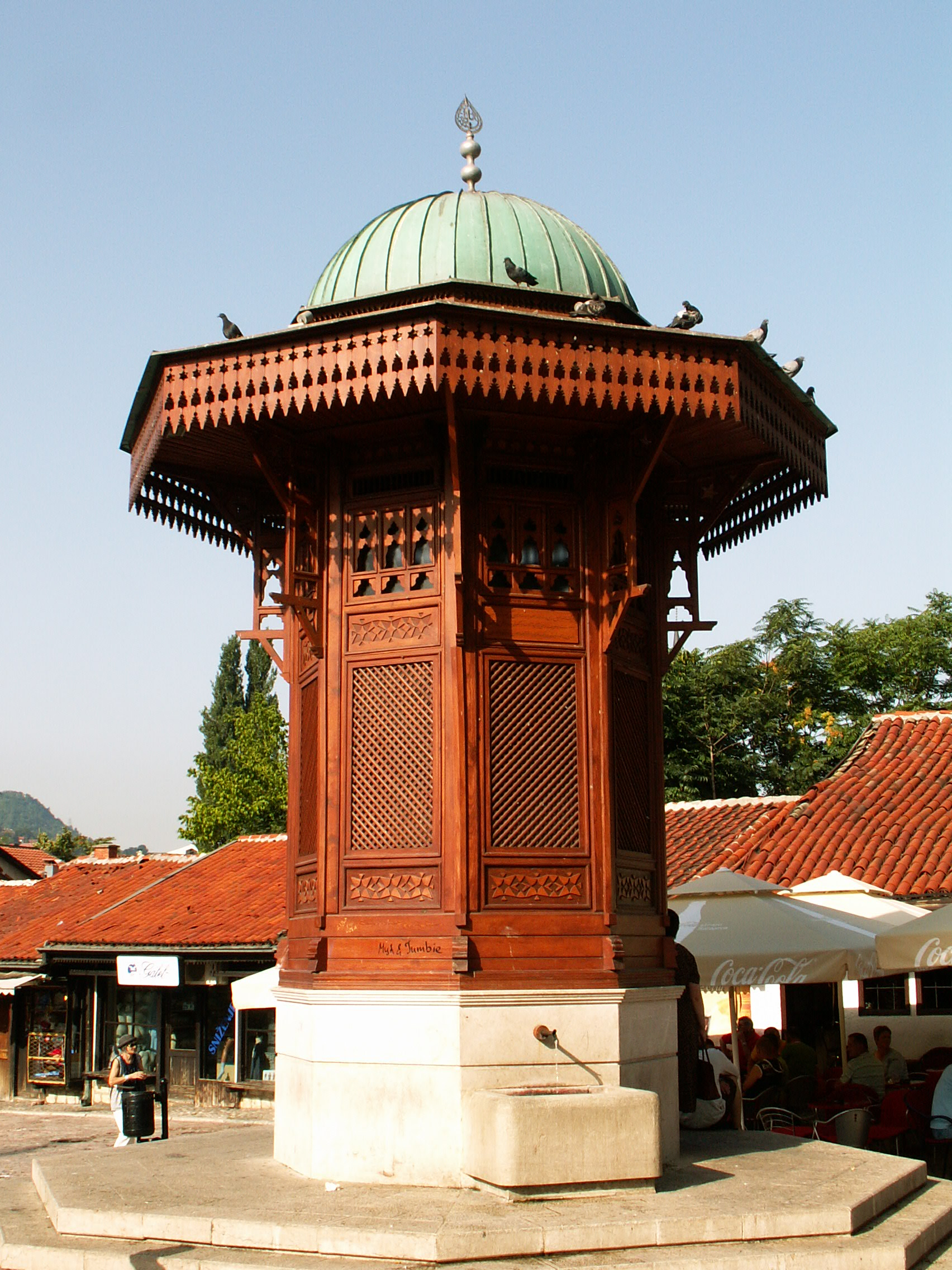
Sebilj (1891)

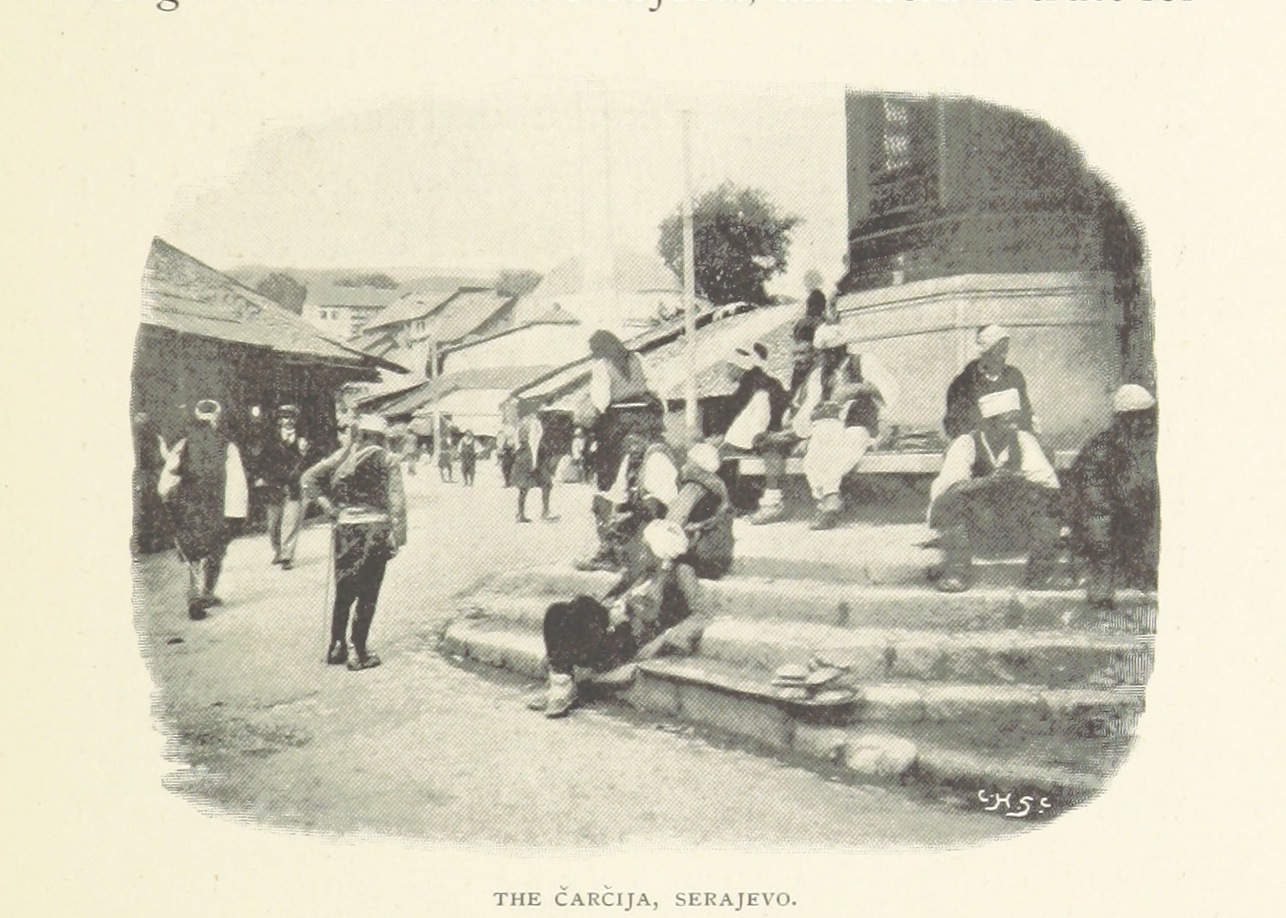
Sebilj in 1897

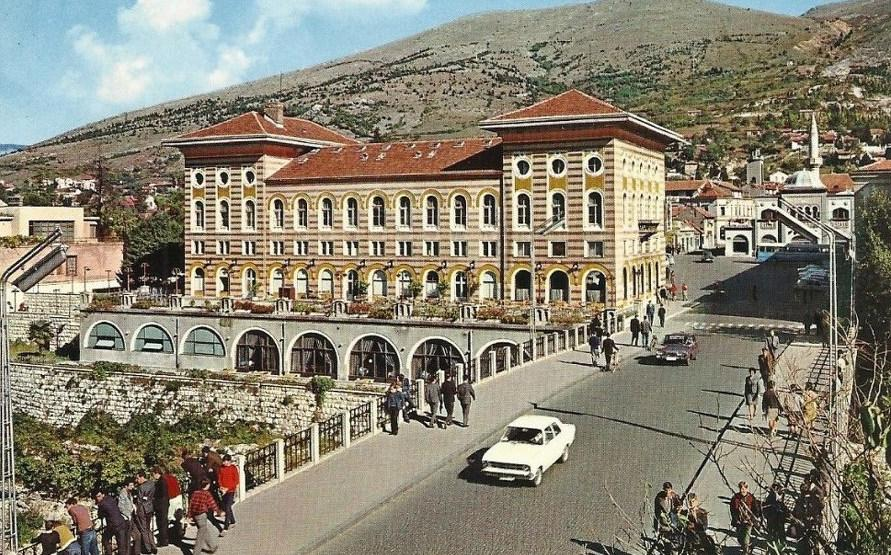
Neretva Hotel 1890-92

== See also ==
- František Blažek
- Josip Vancaš
- Karel Pařík
- Juraj Neidhardt
