= History of Bosnian Americans in St. Louis =

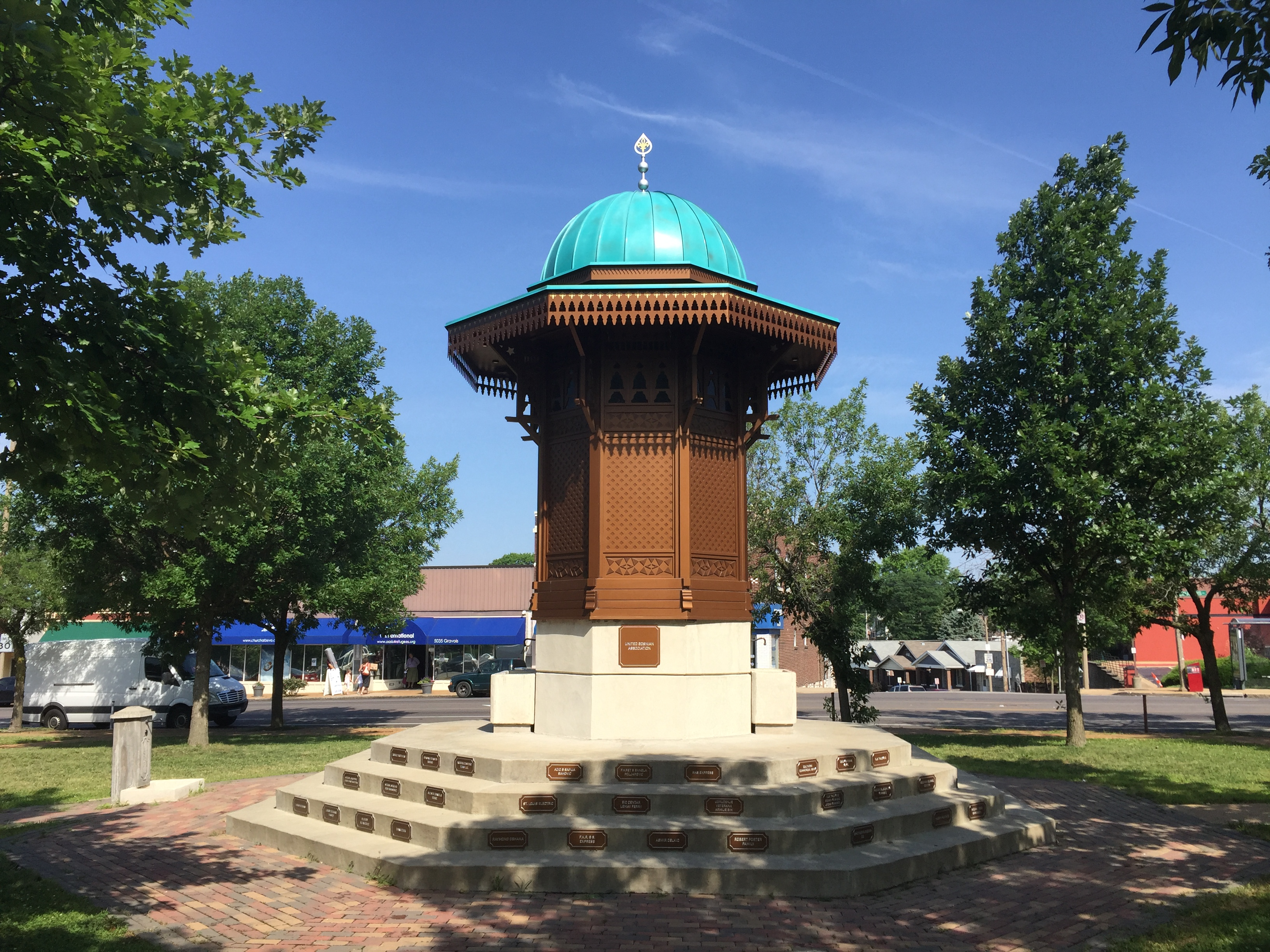
Sebilj in St. Louis, a replica of the Sebilj in Sarajevo, June 2018

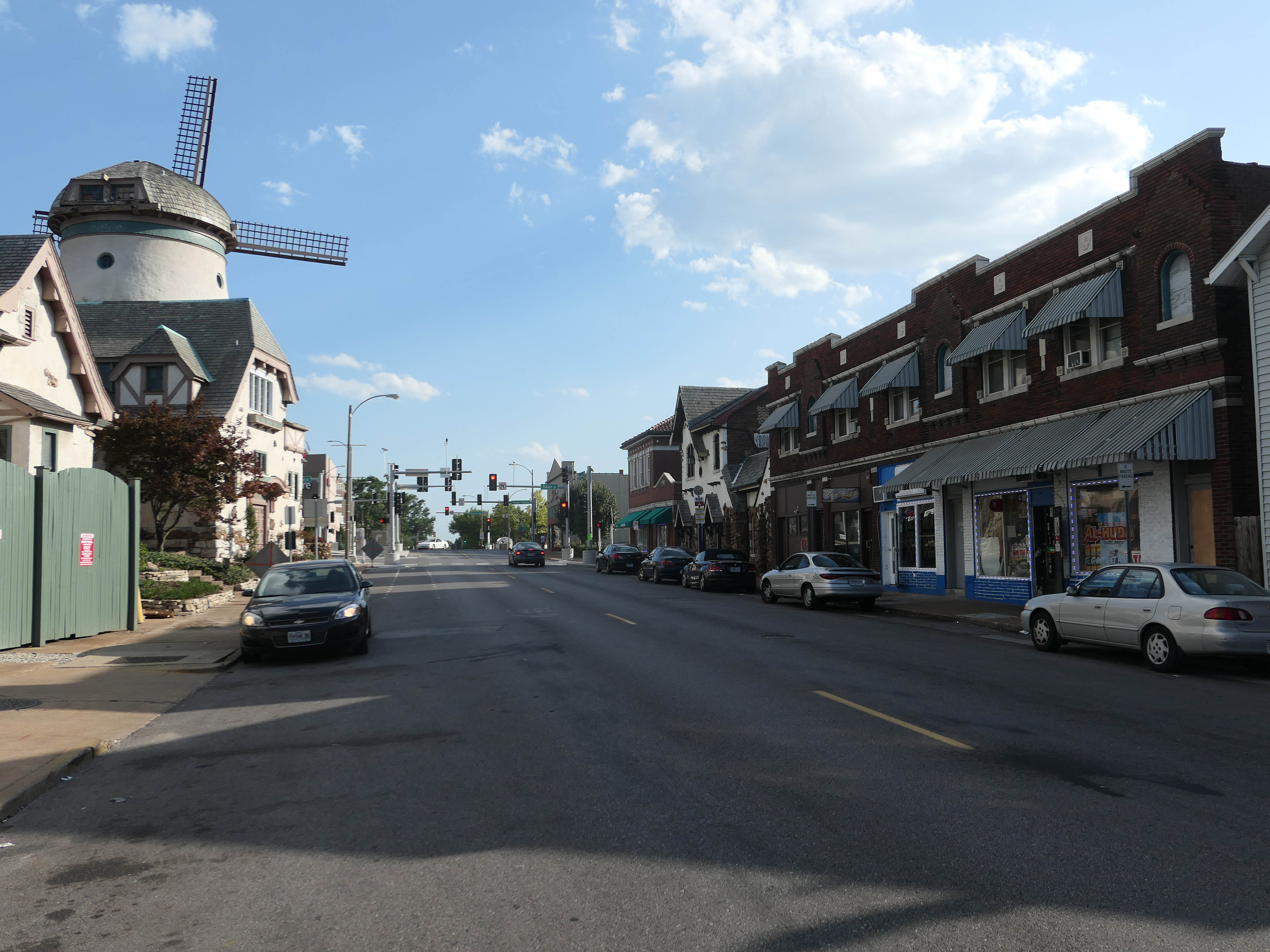
"Little Bosnia" in the neighborhood of Bevo Mill, July 2017

The metropolitan area of Greater St. Louis, Missouri is tied with Chicago, Illinois for the largest Bosnian American population in the United States, and, as of 2018, reportedly had the largest Bosnian population outside of Bosnia and Herzegovina. The population of Bosnian Americans in St. Louis, initially concentrated in the "Little Bosnia" neighborhood of Bevo Mill, has spread to include suburbs in south St. Louis County such as Affton, Mehlville, and Oakville. The region's Bosnian cultural imprint can be seen in its numerous Bosnian restaurants, bakeries, and cafes, as well as several Bosnian mosques and religious organizations.

== History ==
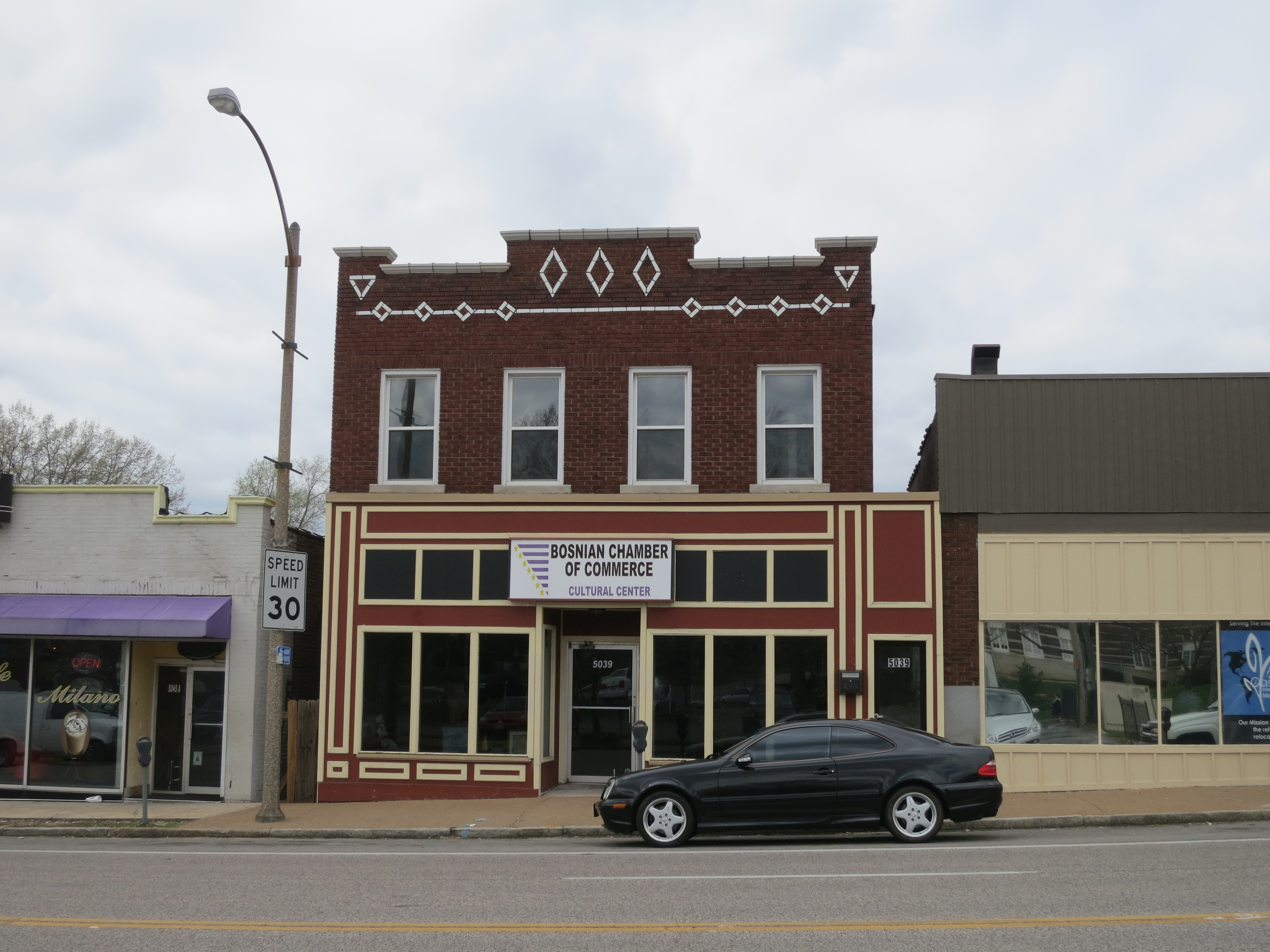
St. Louis Bosnian Chamber of Commerce, April 2013

Although immigrants from Bosnia and Herzegovina began arriving in the United States in the late 19th century, the largest wave of Bosnians to arrive in St. Louis came in the 1990s as refugees of the Bosnian War. St. Louis was one of the main U.S. cities where the U.S. government placed Bosnian refugees due to its relatively inexpensive housing and the availability of suitable jobs. Between 1993 and 2001, the International Institute of St. Louis and Catholic Charities Refugee Services facilitated the resettlement of about 11,000 Bosnians in St. Louis.

Aided by a local bank that provided loans to Bosnians without a U.S. credit history, Bosnian refugees founded numerous small businesses such as auto shops, coffee shops, restaurants, and trucking companies. Their success revitalized struggling neighborhoods in the city of St. Louis and spurred a wave of secondary migration of Bosnians who had initially been settled elsewhere but chose to relocate to St. Louis. According to the International Institute of St. Louis, the number of people of Bosnian origin in the St. Louis region reached its highest point--around 70,000--in the late 1990s and early 2000s.

Media outlets soon emerged to serve this community, including Bosnian-language programming on WEW 770 AM in St. Louis and the weekly newspaper SabaH. SabaH was distributed nationwide and was originally published in New York City, but its owner and publisher, Sukrija Dzidzovic, moved operations to St. Louis in 2006. At one point three Bosnian-language newspapers were based in St. Louis, but they lost readership as younger generations came to prefer reading in English. SabaH ceased publication in 2014.

St. Louis Bosnians include the largest population of survivors of the 1995 Srebrenica massacre outside of Bosnia. In 2000, the book After the Fall: Srebrenica Survivors in St. Louis was published, which featured stories and portraits of one extended family. The interviews were compiled by Patrick McCarthy in collaboration with photographer Tom Maday and translator and interpreter Lejla Susic.

To collect and preserve oral histories of St. Louis Bosnians, the Bosnian Memory Project was founded at Fontbonne University in 2007 by Fontbonne English professor Benjamin Moore. The organization was rededicated as the Center for Bosnian Studies in 2022 and moved to Saint Louis University in 2025 under the leadership of its director, Adna Karamehic-Oates.

On September 29, 2013, the St. Louis Bosnian community donated a replica of the 18th-century Sarajevo Sebilj (kiosk-shaped public fountain) to the city of St. Louis for the city's 250th anniversary. Just as the Sarajevo sebilj marks the center of that community, the St. Louis sebilj sits at the heart of the Bevo Mill neighborhood near the intersection of Gravois Avenue and Morgan Ford Road. At the groundbreaking for the St. Louis sebilj, both Mayor Francis Slay of St. Louis and President Željko Komšić of Bosnia and Herzegovina spoke, expressing their respective thanks for the contributions of Bosnian immigrants to the life of the city and for the city's embrace of the local Bosnian community.

By the 2010s the Bevo Mill neighborhood was still home to numerous Bosnian-owned businesses and the Bosnian Chamber of Commerce, but St. Louis Bosnians had begun moving to the suburbs of south St. Louis County in search of better public schools, larger homes with yards, and lower crime rates.

In 2014, a Bosniak-American named Zemir Begić was beaten to death with hammers. The murder caused shock in the Bosnian community of St. Louis and protests were held against violent crime. Because Begić was white and his suspected assailants were black and Latino, some claimed that the murder of Begić was an example of "black-on-white" crime while others claimed it was a "a targeted attack on Bosnians". While the belief that Begić was targeted due to his ethnicity or race contributed to racial tensions between the Black community and white Muslims of Bosnian descent, St. Louis police did not believe the attack had any ethnic or racial basis.

In 2022, the documentary A New Home by filmmaker Joseph Puleo, which told stories of the St. Louis Bosnian community from the war to their present lives in St. Louis, premiered at the Whitaker St. Louis Filmmakers Showcase. The same year, the book Bosnian St. Louis: Between Two Worlds by Patrick McCarthy and Akif Cogo was published by the Missouri Historical Society .

== Demographics ==
As of 2013 there were 70,000 Bosnians in St. Louis. This was the largest population of Bosnians in the United States and the largest Bosnian population outside of Europe. As of 2024, estimates placed the number of Bosnian Americans in St. Louis metropolitan area at about 50,000. Most are Bosniak and practice Islam, but a minority composed of Bosnian Serbs and Bosnian Croats practice other religions including Roman Catholicism and Eastern Orthodoxy.

As of 2013 the highest concentrations of Bosnians are in the neighborhood of Bevo Mill.

== See also ==
- Bevo Mill, St. Louis
- St. Louis Islamic Center
