= Neretva Hotel =

Hotel in Mostar, Bosnia and Herzegovina

Hotel Neretva - Tapestry Collection by Hilton
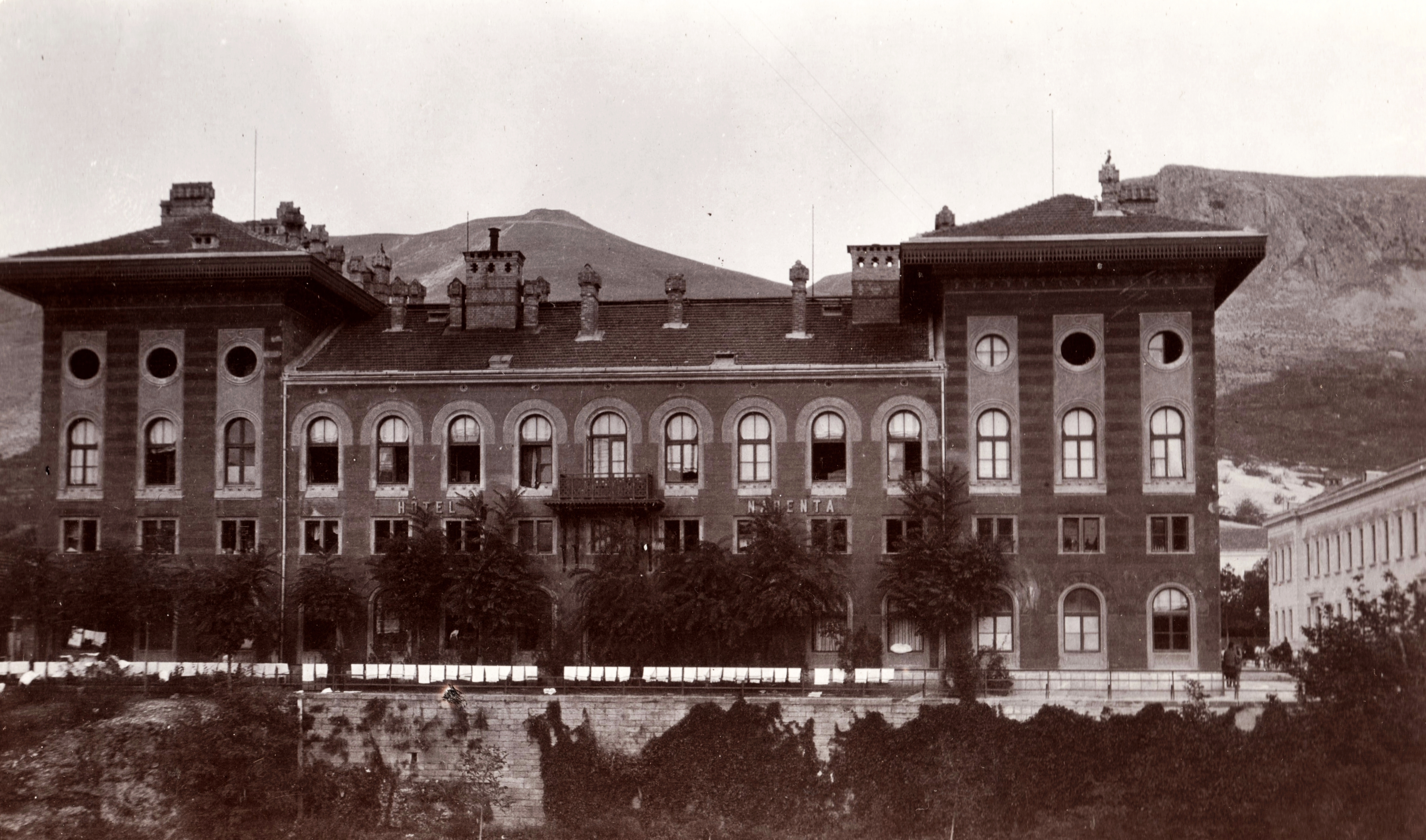
- Interactive map of the Hotel Neretva - Tapestry Collection by Hilton area
- Former names: Hotel Neretva (1892–1992)
- Hotel chain: Hilton Hotels - Tapestry Collection by Hilton

General information
- Location: Old Town, Mostar, Mostar, Bosnia and Herzegovina, Lacina Street; Mostar 88000
- Coordinates: 43°20′40″N 17°48′39″E
- Opening: 1892
- Owner: Halim Zukić
- Operator: Interšped d.o.o. Sarajevo

Design and construction
- Architects: Alexander Wittek (1890): (2024 renovation)

Other information
- Number of rooms: 80

Hotel Neretva (Bosnian Cyrillic: Хотел Неретва) is a hotel in Mostar, Bosnia and Herzegovina. It was designed in 1890. by architect Alexander Wittek and built in a specific pseudo-Moorish style, which was dominant from the end of the 19th century, on the left bank of the Neretva river, in the heart of Old town of Mostar, in 1892, during the Austro-Hungarian rule in Bosnia and Herzegovina.

Numerous world leaders have stayed in it to this day, from Emperor Franc Joseph to Josip Broz Tito and numerous tourists from many parts of the world. On the approximately one hundredth anniversary of the hotel (despite several renovations and additions), the hotel was ripe for a serious renovation, which it did not receive because the hotel building was destroyed in the first months of the Bosnian war in 1992, along with almost all important city buildings.

The building of the hotel is included into the Provisional List of National Monuments of Bosnia and Herzegovina, by KONS.

== History ==
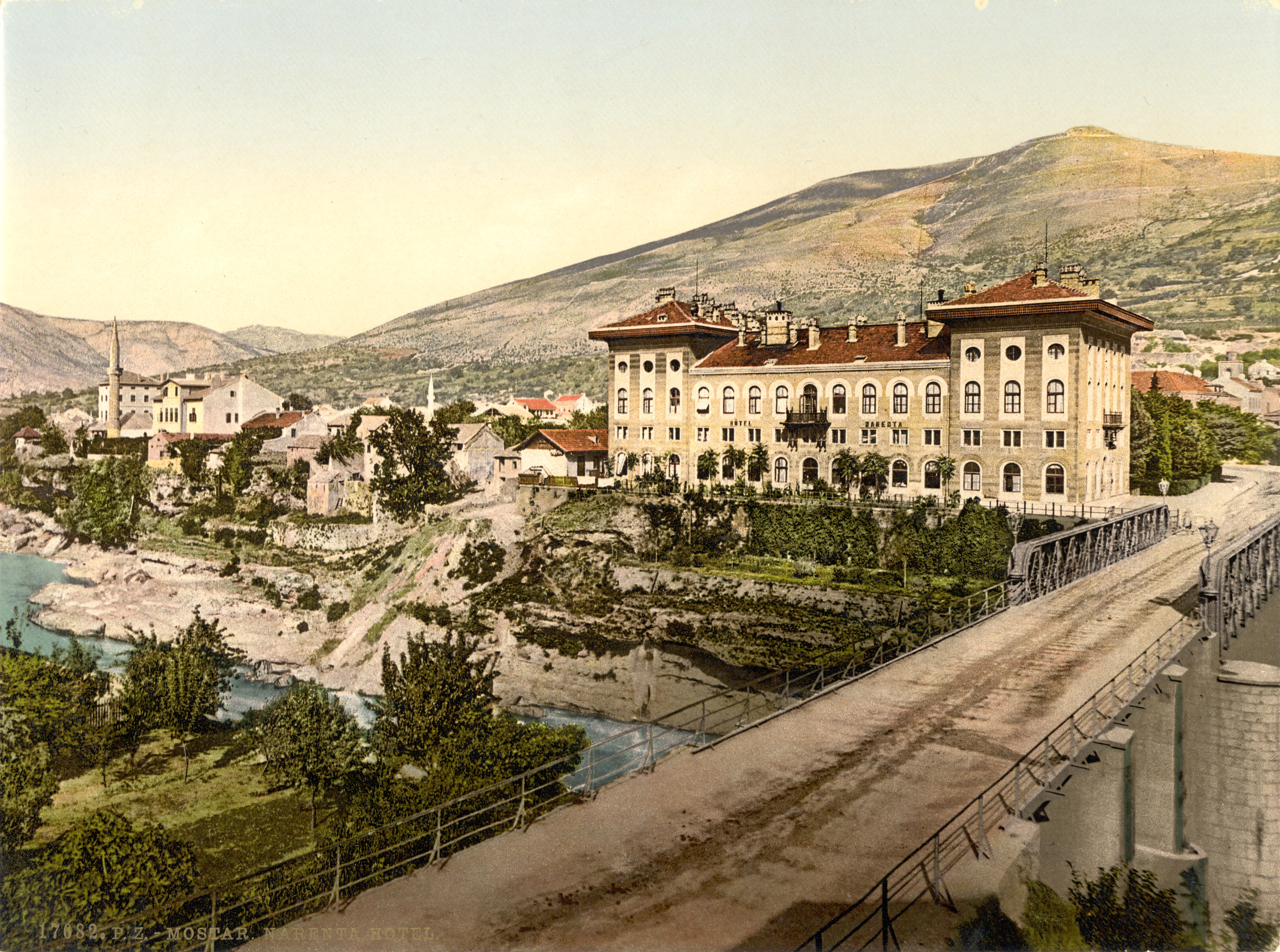
Hotel Neretva from the end of the 19th century. was created in the newly founded social center of Mostar

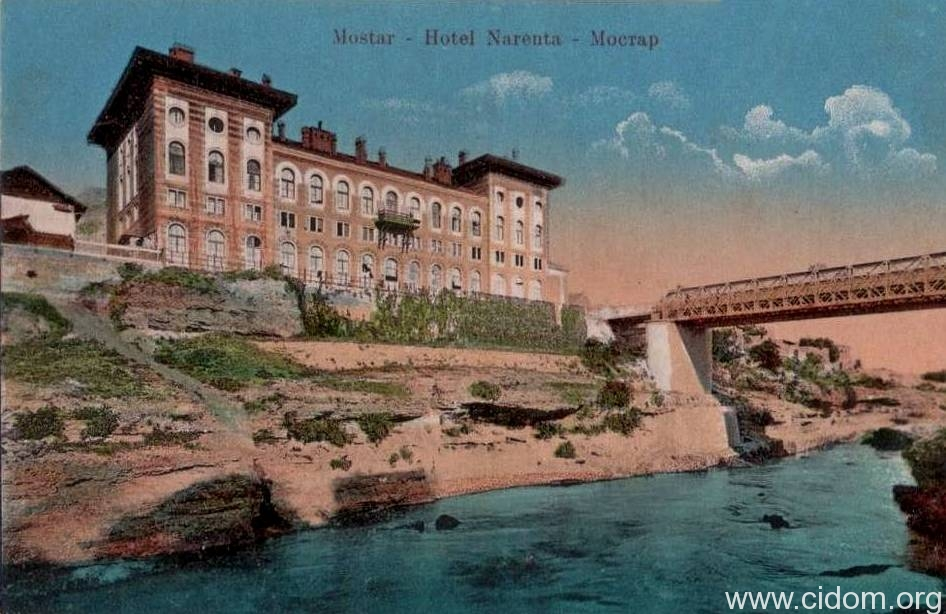
Hotel Neretva from the end of the 19th century.

In Mostar, at the end of the 19th century, a city zone was defined on the tops of the triangular valley, which is cut along by the Neretva river. The increased traffic needs required a better connection across the Neretva, so in addition to the existing Stari Most bridge, which is being adapted for road traffic, three more bridges were built. The central city axis that connected the railway station - the new business center in the west - with the Francis Joseph Bridge (1888) with the mosque on the left bank, was transformed into a new social center. A school, a hotel "Neretva" and a city bath, colloquially named the Banja, are being built on that area, buildings that replace old inns and hammams. Parallel to the construction of this space, the architects of that time introduced eclectic decorative elements collected during study trips of Austrian architects in Egypt and Spain, with the aim of not completely negating the Islamic architectural spirit of the city environment.

Thus, at the end of the 19th century, the "Neretva" hotel was created, which at the time of its construction in 1892 brought to Mostar not only a new architectural style but also the spirit of life in Europe with a new type of guest rooms, meeting rooms or reading rooms accompanied by piano music. The hotel served the famous Sachertorte cake and Wiener schnitzel, prepared by chefs hired from Prague.

The hotel was one of the few places in the city of Mostar where guests could "dance with dinner and variety of cakes, which the waiter brought to the guests' table, so it was difficult for any of the guests to refuse them".

In the hundredth year of its existence, instead of the planned reconstruction, the building was destroyed in the first months of the war on the soil of Bosnia and Herzegovina in 1992, together with almost all important city buildings.

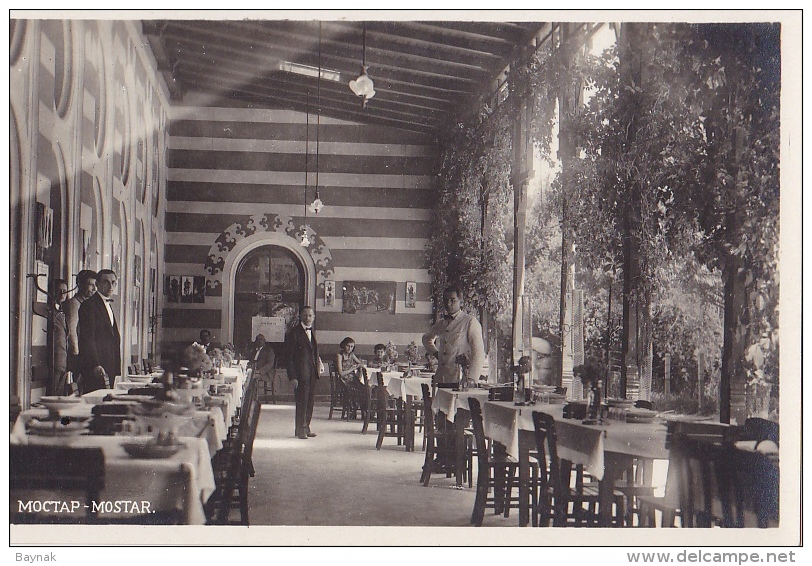
Morning coffee was sipped in the shade of the park, and evening coffee on the terrace on the west side of the Hotel overlooking Neretva river..

== Architectural outlook ==
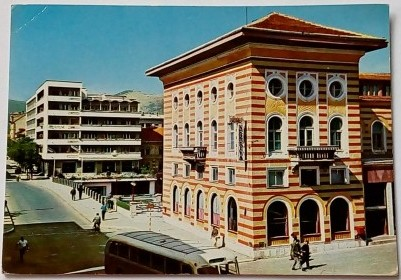
The hotel building has an imposing facade in monarchical yellow-red horizontal stripes

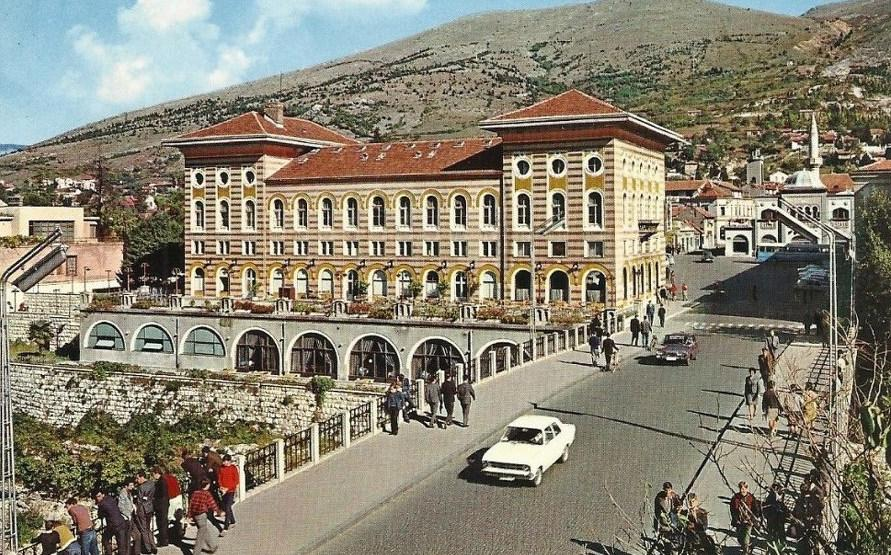
Many years after its construction, the building made contact with the Neretva River through two terraces.

With its volume and appearance, the building was foreign to the Herzegovinian with the Ottoman urban history - as a huge building with an imposing facade in monarchical yellow-red horizontal stripes. It was built in pseudo-Moorish style (or as it is more precisely called in science, neo-Islamic or neo-Oriental style) which is characterized by characteristic elements of Hellenistic-Seljuk and Ottoman art taken from the Mozarabic artistic areas of Spain, the Maghreb and Cairo. Many of the buildings left by the Austro-Hungarian government in Bosnia and Herzegovina were built in the pseudo-Moorish style, which remained synonymous with the period of Austro-Hungarian rule in Bosnia and Herzegovina. Formal features most often include horseshoe arches, stucco ornamentation, bulbous domes and decoration of horizontal exterior lines in characteristic colors.

The building was built on the very bank of the Neretva River, only many years after its construction, the building made contact with the river through two terraces. The original orientation of the hotel was towards the east, towards a park dominated by a pool with goldfish, which attracted everyone, especially children, until 1976, when the entire area was remodeled by decision of the political structure of the time.

== Restoration and franchising ==
After buying the ruined hotel, its new owner Halim Zukić, who needed a full six years to obtain the necessary approvals, did not carry out the work planned in the first phase of the hotel's renovation, which made the building ruinous.

When, finally, in 2018, the city officials granted permission for the temporary occupation of public space to Zukić, he opened the construction site for the execution of works and began the restoration, and extension of the "Neretva" hotel.

Works are performed under the supervision of the Institute for the Protection of Monuments of the Federation of Bosnia and Herzegovina.

=== Tapestry Collection by Hilton ===
A company owned by Halim Zukić, Interšped d.o.o. Sarajevo, concluded a franchise agreement with Hilton hotel chain, and announces the opening of two hotels in Bosnia and Herzegovina, one in Sarajevo, Sarajevo City Centre Hotel - Hampton by Hilton, and other in Mostar, Hotel Neretva - Tapestry Collection by Hilton. It is announced that Neretva Hotel will have 80 rooms. The signing of the franchise agreement happened at the Waldorf Astoria Berlin hotel, between Zukić and Executive Vice President of Hilton who is also Hilton's President of the EMEA region.
