= Bosnian-American Islamic Cultural Center =

Mosque and cultural center in Hartford, Connecticut

Coordinates: 41.73196°N 72.67503°W

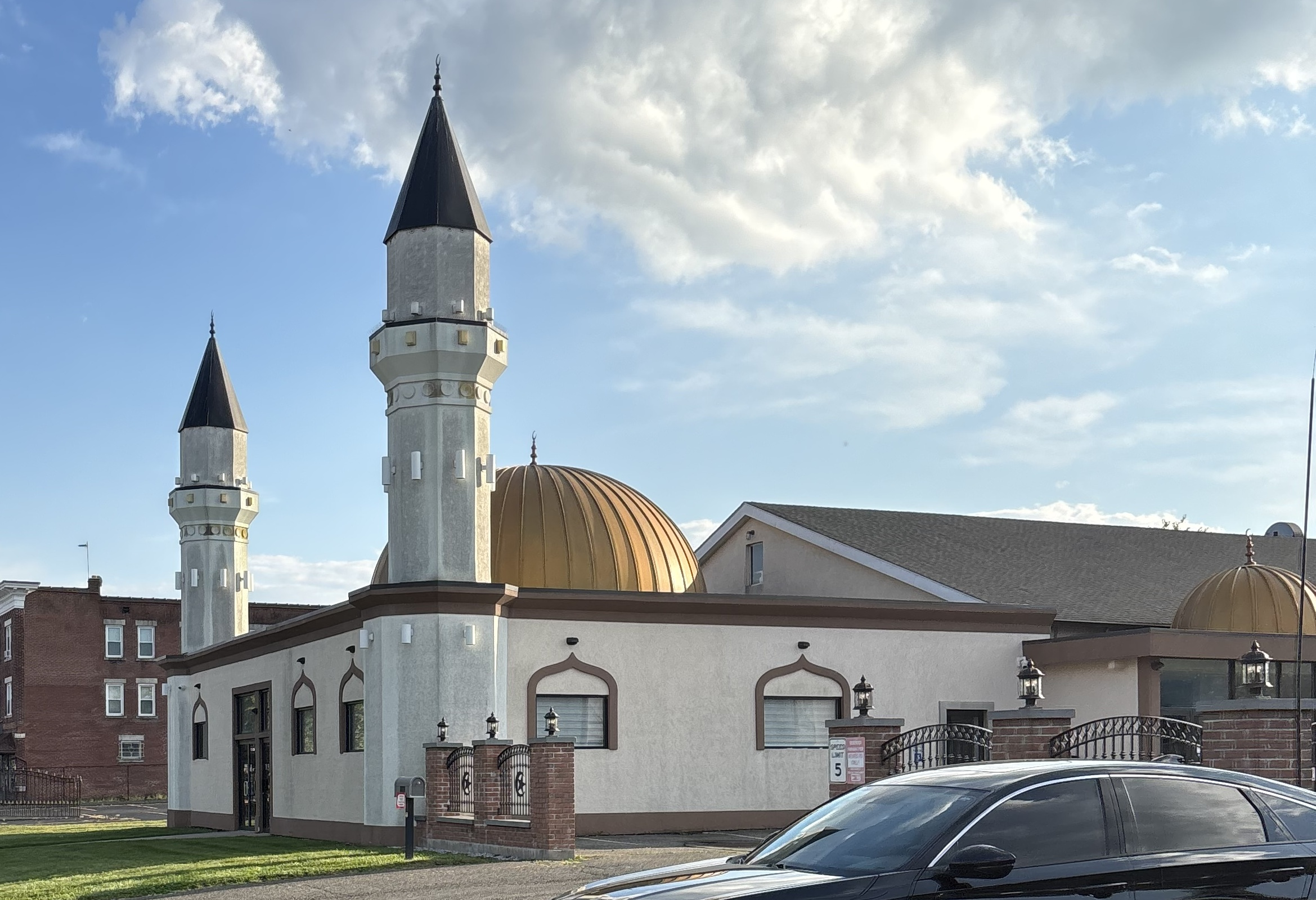
- The Bosnian-American Islamic Cultural Center in 2025.

Religion
- Affiliation: Islam

Location
- Location: Hartford, Connecticut
- Municipality: Hartford
- Country: United States
- Interactive map of Bosnian-American Islamic Cultural Center

Architecture
- Type: Mosque, Islamic educational center and cultural center
- Founder: Bosnian-American immigrants
- Established: 2004

Website
- www.baicchartford.org

The Bosnian-American Islamic Cultural Center is a mosque and cultural center in Hartford, Connecticut. The center is affiliated with the Islamic Community of North American Bosniaks.

== History ==
The Bosnian-American Islamic Cultural Center (BAICC) was founded in 2004 by Bosnian-American immigrants who moved to the United States as refugees during the Yugoslav War in the mid-1990s. Many Bosnian immigrants moved to the Hartford-Wethersfield area, where they settled in "Bosnia Square." The region had long been inhabited by Italian immigrants.

The first BAICC was set up in a small room in a grocery store, which the community quickly outgrew. In 2007, the BAICC purchased their own building, a former automobile shop. The BAICC serves as a mosque, cultural center, and Islamic school for the growing Bosnian population in the greater Hartford area. The mosque is led by Imam Mirzet Mehmedović, who has led the center since its founding. Since the founding of the BAICC, the Bosnian population has continued to grow rapidly in the region. By 2013, Bosnian-Americans had become one of the largest and fastest-growing ethnic groups in the area. In 2023, Miki Durić became the first Bosnian-American city councilor in Wethersfield.
