= List of Bosnian Americans =

This is a list of notable Bosnian Americans, including both original immigrants who obtained American citizenship and their American descendants.

== Art ==
- Adi Granov, comic book artist
- Endi E. Poskovic, artist and printmaker
- Maja Ruznic, painter

== Literature ==
- Aleksandar Hemon, fiction writer
- Téa Obreht, novelist
- Semir Osmanagić, writer
- Sasha Skenderija, poet

== Film ==
- Miraj Grbić, actor
- Karl Malden (1912–2009), actor
- Sulejman Medenčević, cinematographer
- Harun Mehmedinović, director, screenwriter and photographer
- Ivana Miličević, actor
- Tinka Milinović, television personality
- Sunny Suljic, actor and skateboarder
- Sabina Vajrača, film director and film producer

== Music ==
- Kemal Gekić (born 1962), pianist
- Flory Jagoda (1923–2021), guitarist, composer and singer
- Vuk Kulenovic, composer
- Mladen Milicevic, composer and professor of music
- Octbrfrst, AKA Emir Agovic, Singer, Engineer, Producer, Graphic Design Artist

== Politics ==
- Anesa Kajtazovic, Iowa State Representative and first Bosnian-American elected official
- Muhamed Sacirbey, businessman, lawyer, and former ambassador

== Sports ==
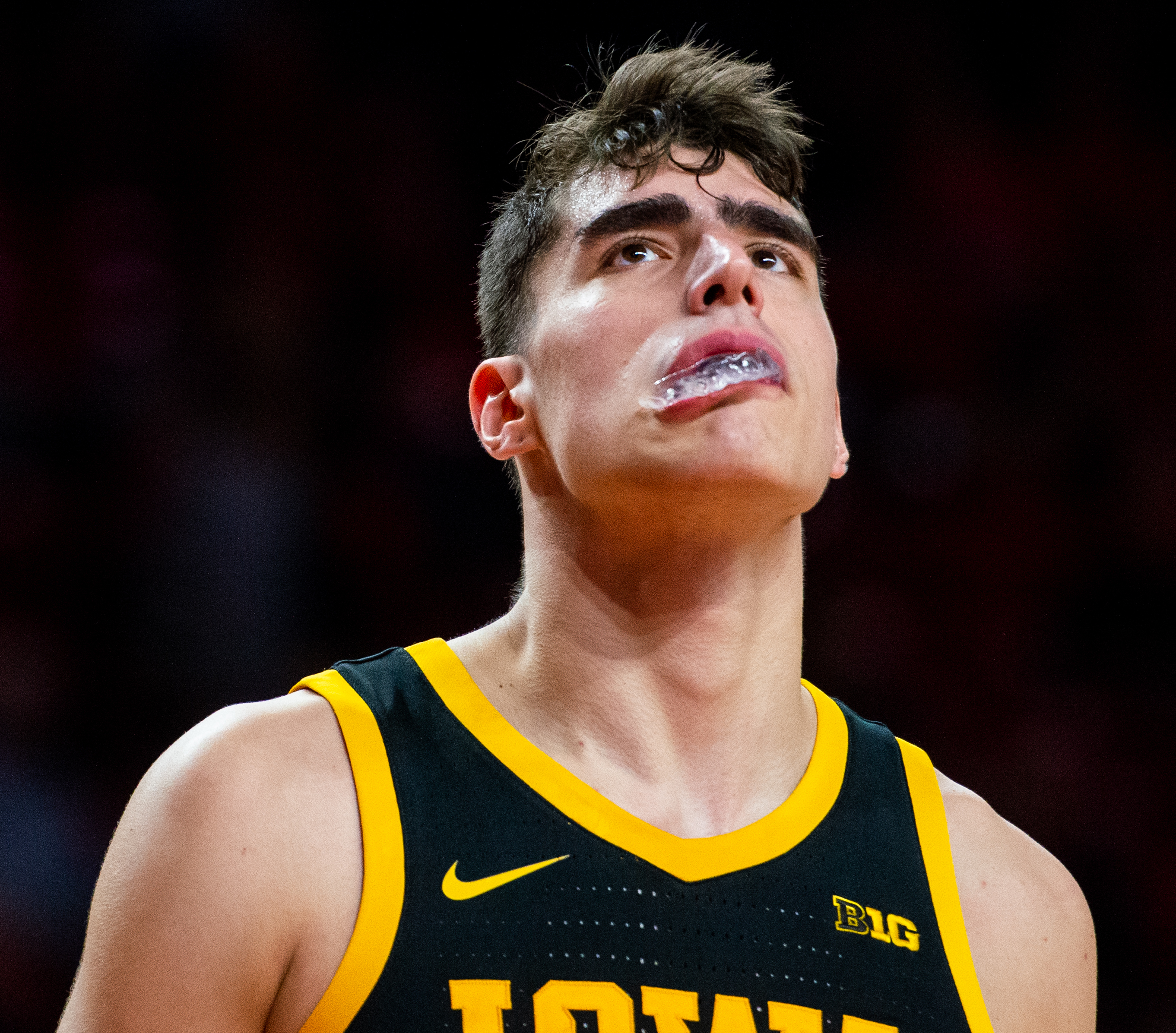
Luka Garza

- Amar Alibegović, basketball player
- Esmir Bajraktarevic, soccer player
- Nina Bates, retired figure skater
- Mirsad Bektic, retired mixed martial artist
- J.R. Bremer, basketball player; Bosnian national team
- Amer Delić, retired tennis player
- Luka Garza, basketball player
- Alen Hadzic, banned fencer
- Adnan Hodzic, basketball player
- Baggio Husidić, retired soccer player
- Vedad Ibišević, retired soccer player
- Slobodan Janjuš, retired soccer player
- Elvir Kafedžić, retired soccer player and coach
- Esad Komić, retired soccer player
- Refik Kozić, retired soccer player
- Damir Krupalija, basketball player
- Peri Marošević, retired soccer player
- Nedim Nišić, olympic swimmer
- Ajdin Penava, basketball player
- Hajrudin Saračević (1949–2022), soccer player
- Mirsad Sejdić, retired soccer player
- Goran Suton, retired basketball player
- Emsad Zahirovic, soccer player
- Christian Yelich, baseball player for the Milwaukee Brewers

== Other ==
- Tea Alagic (born 1972), theatre director
- Ervin Sejdic, North York General Hospital's Research Chair in Artificial Intelligence for Health Outcomes
- Mirsad Hadžikadić, UNC Charlotte professor and executive director of analytical programs.
- Sanela Diana Jenkins, entrepreneur and philanthropist; established the International Justice Clinic
