= Zambak =

Zambak magazine
- First issue: 1994
- Final issue: 2008
- Based in: Chicago, U.S
- Language: Bosnian, English

Zambak magazine was an ethnic Bosniak political magazine published in Chicago between the years 1994 and 2008. It was founded during the war in Bosnia and Herzegovina as large groups of Bosnian refugees settled in the United States. Zambak started as a newsletter published by the Information Center of Bosnia Herzegovina in Chicago, and one year later it became an independent magazine publishing monthly issues until 2008.

== History ==
Zambak reported on political, economic, and cultural developments globally, in Bosnia and Herzegovina, as well as on the activities of the local Bosnian community in Chicago. The magazine's mission was to inform and support the process of integration of the thousands of newly arrived emigres from the conflict-ridden Balkan region. It promoted strong links between local small-businesses and the community. Zambak was committed to upholding and promoting the belief of a united and multi-ethnic Bosnia and Herzegovina by fostering a platform for diverse political exchanges.

Zambak's director and owner was Ismet Berbić. Its editors, over the years, include: Bakir Viteškić, Mensur Seferović, Esad Boškailo, Amir Berberkić, and Mugdim Karabeg. Regular contributors from Bosnia and Herzegovina were notable writers and journalists such as Mile Stojić and Gojko Berić, amongst others.

Zambak was recognized for its particular attention to arts and culture and design and illustrations. The magazine's use of provocative, satirical and politically engaged covers reflected the pertinent themes of each issue. Zambak was art-directed by brothers Amir Berbić (1998–2004) and Isak Berbić (2004–2008).

Zambak was distributed free of charge, which was made possible by the financial support of local businesses. In 2008, after 105 published issues, Zambak ceased publication amidst difficult financial circumstances.

Throughout its history, Zambak's contributors published stories on politics, war, immigrant life in the US, culture, arts, and education.

== Name ==
The name Zambak (Lily) is in reference to the fleur-de-lis symbol, lilium bosniacum, on the Bosnian medieval coat of arms which was revitalized in the early 1990s Bosnian independence movements.
