= Sebilj in Sarajevo =

Fountain in Sarajevo, Bosnia and Herzegovina

Sebilj
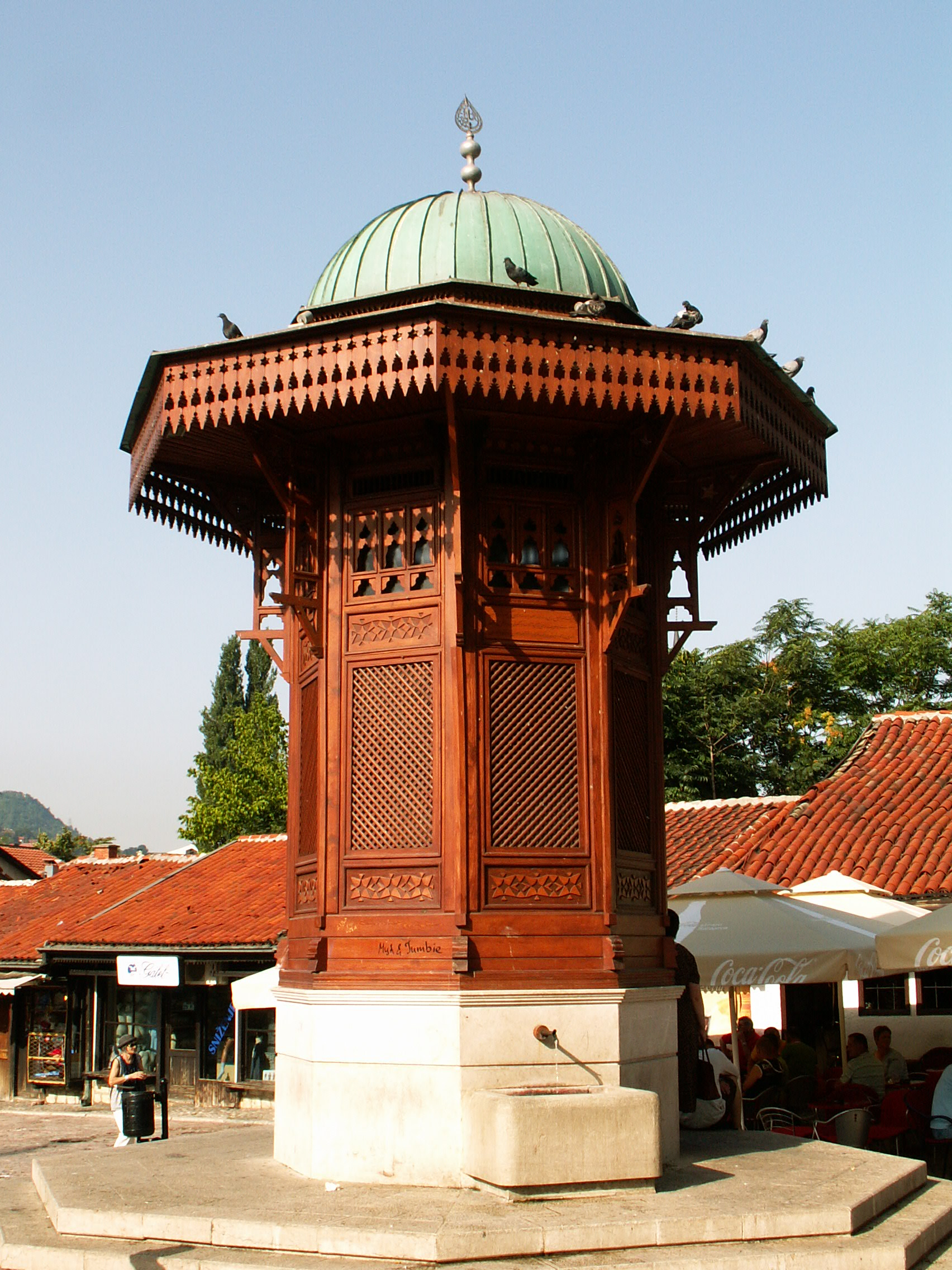
- The Sebilj in Baščaršija
- Interactive map of the Sebilj area

General information
- Location: Sarajevo, Bosnia and Herzegovina
- Completed: 1753, destroyed by fire in 1852, reconstructed 1891

Design and construction
- Architect: Mehmed Pasha Kukavica born in Foča

The Sebilj is an Ottoman-style wooden fountain (sebil) in the centre of Baščaršija Square in Sarajevo. The original Sebilj was built by Mehmed Pasha Kukavica in 1753, but it was destroyed in a fire in 1852. It was reconstructed by the Austrian architect Alexander Wittek in 1891, and was relocated to its present site several metres away from the position of the earlier structure. According to local legend, visitors who drink water from the fountain will return to Sarajevo someday.

== Replicas ==
Various cities have or had replicas of Sarajevo's Sebilj:

- Belgrade, Serbia: donated by the city of Sarajevo in 1989 as a gift ahead of the 9th Summit of the Non-Aligned Movement.
- Birmingham, United Kingdom: A public art piece based on the Sebilj was unveiled in 2008.
- Novi Pazar, Serbia: also a gift from the city of Sarajevo, made in 2010.
- St. Louis, Missouri, United States: donated by the Bosnian community to the city of St. Louis for the city's 250th birthday in 2014.
- Bursa, Turkey: built as a symbol of friendship between the city of Bursa and the city of Sarajevo.
- Rožaje, Montenegro: built in 2018
- Utica, New York, United States: built in 2025 by local Bosnian American association
