= Bosnians in Chicago =

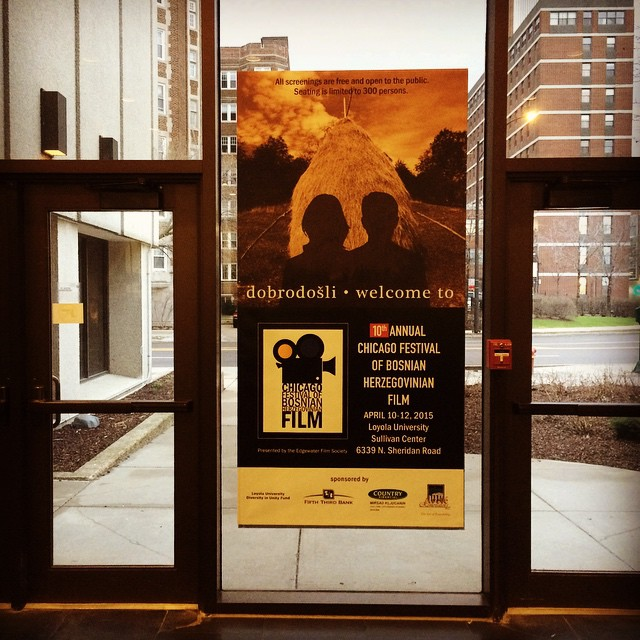
Chicago festival of Bosnian Herzegovinian film at Loyola University

The city of Chicago, Illinois, is tied with St. Louis for the largest Bosnian-American population and the largest number of Bosnians outside of Europe. According to 2018-2022 Census estimates, Illinois is the most common state of residence for Bosnian immigrants, with 10,800 (approximately 1 in every 10 Bosnian immigrants to the US) in the state and 8,200 in Cook County alone. The largest concentration of Bosnians in Chicago live on the North Side.

== History ==
The first Bosnians settled in Chicago in the late 19th and early 20th centuries, joining other immigrants seeking better opportunities and better lives. As the former Yugoslavia continued to find its identity as a nation over the last century, the people of Bosnia and Herzegovina sought stability and new beginnings in the city of Chicago, with many intending to return to their homeland.

The Bosnian Muslim community received a new influx of migrants after World War II who were displaced by the War and the communist takeover. As the population increased in the early 1950s, the community invited Sheik Kamil Avdich (Ćamil Avdić) to become the first permanent imam (religious minister). Under Imam Kamil's leadership, the Muslim Religious and Cultural Home was established to raise funds for a mosque, which opened on Halsted Street in 1957. In 1968, the organization's name was changed to the Bosnian American Cultural Association, and in the early 1970s it purchased land in Northbrook to build a larger mosque and cultural center. The Islamic Cultural Center of Greater Chicago has remained an important center for Muslim religious activity, serving Bosnian and non-Bosnian Muslims in the Chicago metropolitan area.

== Demographics ==
Approximately 40,000 Bosnians arrived in Chicago in the 1990s and early 2000s, mainly as refugees during the Bosnian War.

Today, approximately 70,000 people of Bosnian ancestry live in Chicago, making both Chicago and St. Louis tied for the largest Bosnian population outside of Europe.

Like in St. Louis, they are mostly Bosniak, but there are significant Croat and Serb minorities.

== Religion ==
Bosnian immigrants during the early 1900s established the first mosque in the city.

Bosnian Muslims were early leaders in the establishment of Chicago's Muslim community. In 1906, they established Džemijetul Hajrije (The Benevolent Society) of Illinois to preserve the community's religious and national traditions, as well as to provide mutual assistance for funerals and illnesses. The organization established branches in Gary, Indiana, in 1913, and Butte, Montana, in 1916, and is the oldest existing Muslim organization in the United States.
