= Peter Matthews (printmaker) =

British printmaker and former teacher

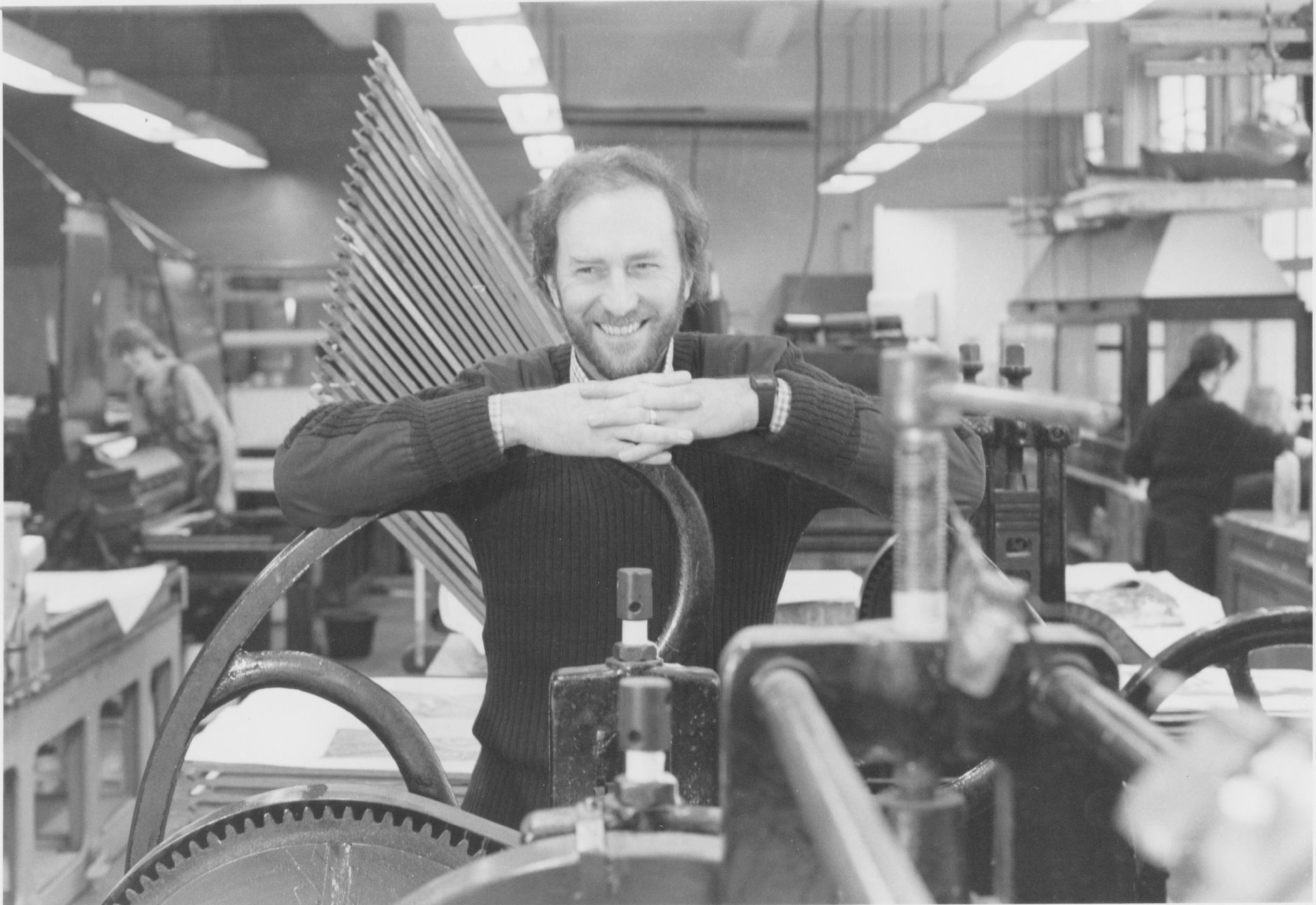
- Born: 29 July 1942 (age 84)
- Education: Ealing School of Art

Peter Jeffrey Matthews (born 29 July 1942) is a British printmaker, former teacher at Royal College of Art (RCA) and senior lecturer at Wimbledon School of Art. Educated at Ealing School of Art, Matthews went on to assist at Editions Alecto and editioned most of David Hockney's early etchings. Matthews has also exhibited his own work extensively including at the Royal Academy of Arts (RA), Royal Watercolour Society (RWS) Gallery, and with the Royal Society of Painter-Printmakers, being elected a Fellow and later Council Member 1984–98. His work is held in a number of public collections in the UK and overseas, including the Victoria & Albert Museum (V&A); British Council;the Ashmolean Museum; Albertina Museum, Vienna; Royal Library of Belgium and the Free Library, Philadelphia.

== Artistic career ==
=== Employment ===
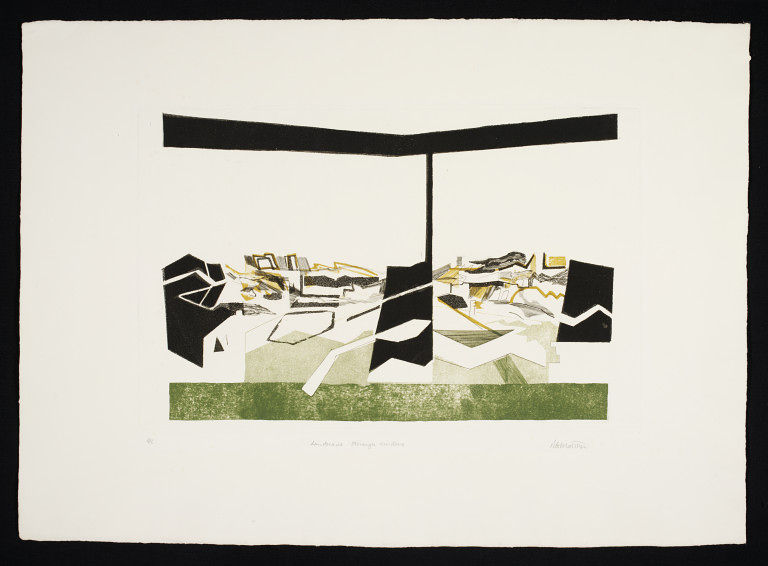
Colour etching and aquatint, 'Landscape Through Windows', Peter Matthews 1967

After graduating from Ealing School of Art, Matthews was appointed craftsman/demonstrator in the Printmaking Department at the RCA in London. He worked with many artists of that time and assisted David Hockney in editioning his early etchings 1962-1964. This included: Myself and My Heroes, Gretchen and the Snurl My Bonnie Lies over the Ocean and Kaisarion and all his Beauty. Matthews reflects on printing Hockney's Kaisarion (while he was still at Ealing) in an interview in 2011. His name is often incorrectly spelled as Peter Mathews when being credited as the printer of Hockney's etchings. In 1966, he became a Senior Lecturer in the Printmaking Department of the Wimbledon School of Art where he taught BA and MA courses in Printmaking until 1998.

=== Body of work ===
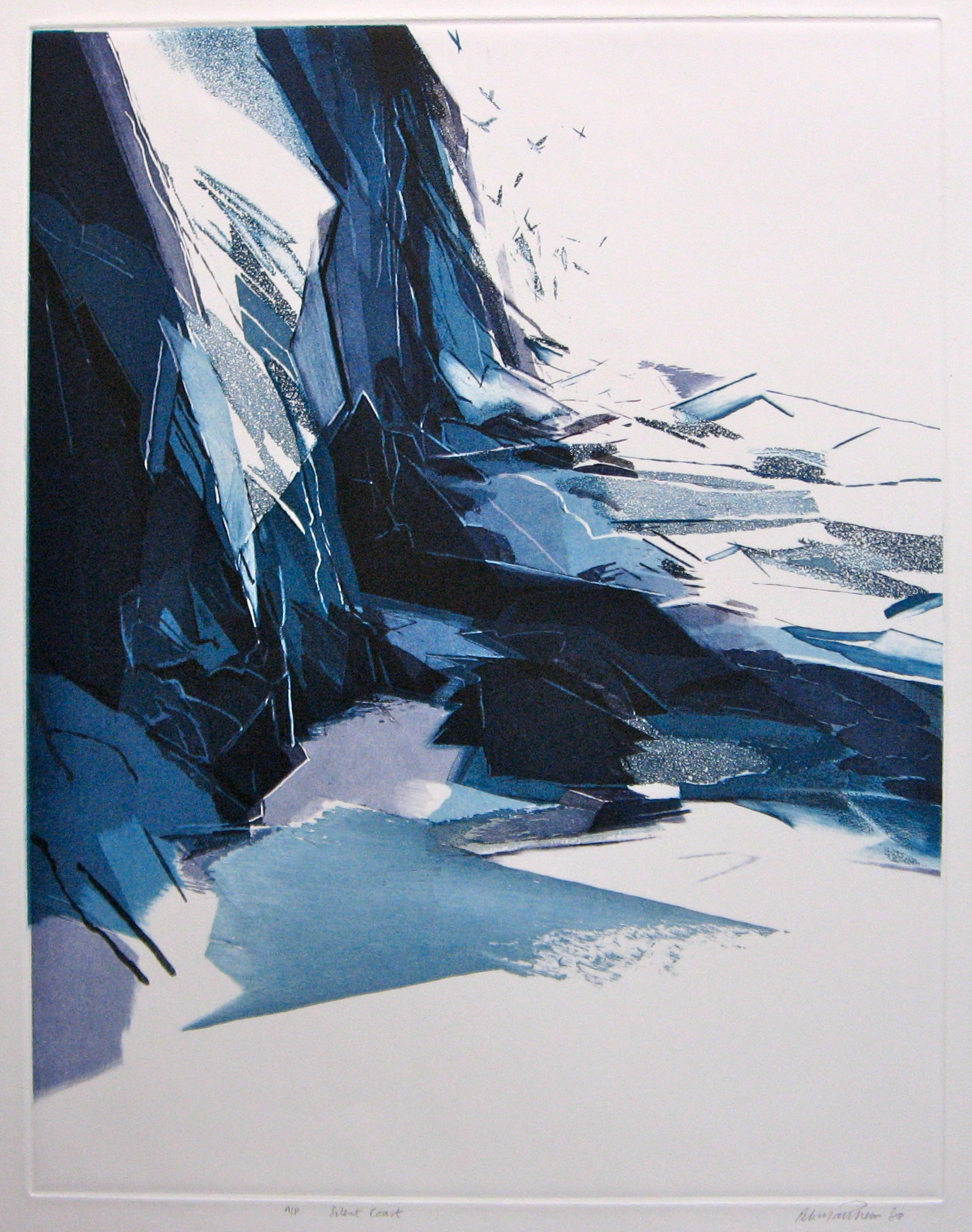
'Silent Coast', Aquatint by Peter Matthews 1988

Landscape has always dominated his work. Early inspiration came from the quarries of Wales and the idea of figures in an empty pared-down landscape. In 1971, he established a studio on the north coast of Scotland. There were no more figures, only the rocks, heather, rivers, cliffs and sea of Caithness and Sutherland. He used several plates for each etching and a wide colour palette a

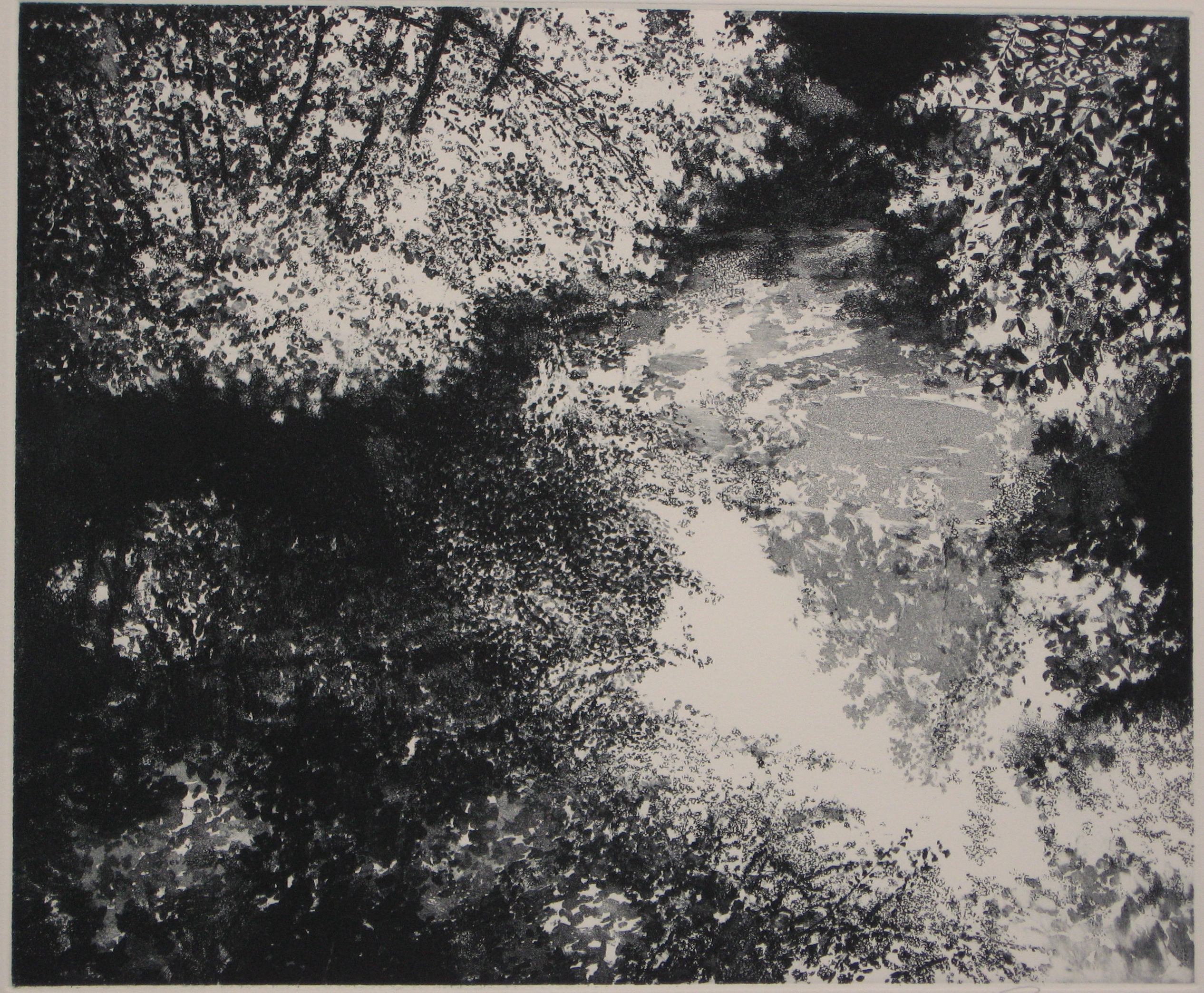
'Morning Calm', Black and White Aquatint by Peter Matthews 1995

In 1991, he moved his studio to South-West France, where the landscape is in direct contrast to Scotland. The French etchings are mainly in black and white and demonstrate his fascination with time of day and shadows. Matthews ceased etching in 1998 and has returned to painting in oils informed by the landscape of the Charente.

During his 37-year career Matthews has had his work exhibited extensively in the UK and overseas both in solo and group exhibitions and his work is held in many public collections around the world. His biography has been listed in Debrett's People of Today 1994–1998 and Who's Who of Art.

== Personal life ==
Matthews now, after living in the Charente region of France for 11 years, resides in Woodbridge, Suffolk.

== Exhibitions ==
=== Solo exhibitions ===
- 1977 Amalgam Gallery, London
- 1978 Galleri Unicorn, Copenhagen
- 1996 Foreign Press Association, London

=== Group exhibitions ===
- 1961 RWS Gallery, London
- 1964 Tib Lane Gallery
- 1966 “British Printmakers in the 60s”, travelling through USA with London Arts gallery
- 1970 AIA Gallery/Royal Institute, Glasgow
- 1972-7 Royal Academy Summer Exhibition
- 1975 Galerie Arnaud, Paris
- 1978 “British Contemporary Etchers”, Associated American Arts Gallery, New York
- 1979 “50 Years of Printmaking at the Royal College of Art”
- 1980-2 Scottish Print Open, Edinburgh, Dundee, Glasgow
- 1983 Scottish Print Open, Sweden. Norway, Finland
- 1983 Exhibition with La Jeune Gravure Contemporaine, Bankside Gallery, London
- 1985 16th Ljubljana Print Biennale, Yugoslavia (British Council invited artist)
- 1985 Contemporary Prints, Barbican Centre, London
- 1986 Grafiska Sallskapets Galleri, Stockholm, Sweden
- 1988 British Contemporary Art Fair
- 1989 Exhibition of British Prints, State Publishing Organisation, Moscow, Russia
- 1989 5th International Print Biennale, Bulgaria (by invitation)
- 1990 AD Fine Art, Barbican Centre, London
- 1994/5 National Print Exhibition, The Mall Galleries, London
- 1994 Grafica Pryzmat, Kraków, Poland
- 1994 Maastricht International Print Biennale, Holland
- 1995 Hochschule Fur Kunste, Bremen, Germany
- 1996 National College of Art and Design, Oslo, Norway
- 1996 Boxed Prints, Hardware Gallery, London
- 1996 New Academy Gallery, London
- 1996 National Gallery, Ulan Bator, Outer Mongolia
- 1997 Morandi Gallery, Bologna, Italy
- 1997 National Print Exhibition, The Mall Galleries

== Public collections ==
- Victoria and Albert Museum
- Ashmolean Museum
- Bibliothèque Royale, Brussels, Belgium
- South London Art Gallery
- Greenwich Library, London
- Cheltenham Art Gallery, England
- Ferens Art Gallery, Hull, England
- Northampton Art Gallery, England
- Southampton Art Gallery, England
- Arts Council, Northern Ireland
- King's College, London
- Free Library, Philadelphia, USA
- Albertina Museum, Vienna, Austria
- British Council
- Morandi Galleria, Bologna, Italy

== Education ==
1957–1962 Ealing School of Art, London National Diploma in Art and Design (Painting and Printmaking)

== Employment ==
- 1961 Editioning, St George’s Gallery, London
- 1962-4 Assisting David Hockney, Editions Alecto, London
- 1962-6 Royal College of Art, Craftsman- Demonstrator in Etching
- 1966–98 Senior Lecturer in Printmaking, Wimbledon School of Art, London
- 2007 Visiting Lecturer, Faculty of Fine Art, University of Yaoundé, Cameroon

== Prizes ==
- 1997 Gavin Graham Award, National Print Exhibition Committees and Public Art Activities:
- 1974–98 Member, Edinburgh Printmakers Workshop
- 1984–98 Fellow and later Council Member, Royal Society of Painter-Printmakers. Now Honorary Fellow.
