= Peter Mathews Memorial Skate Garden =

First legal skatepark in St. Louis, Missouri

- Interactive map of Peter Mathews Memorial Skate Garden
- Type: Skatepark
- Location: St. Louis
- Coordinates: 38.588271°N 90.265055°W
- Area: 14,000 sq ft
- Open: All year
- Terrain: Concrete
- Public transit: MetroBus

Peter Mathews Memorial Skate Garden is St. Louis' first legal outdoor public skate park.

== History ==
The Peter Mathews Memorial Skate Garden is built on a Brownfield site of a Bevo Mill former gas station, auto repair, and radiator service station that ceased operating in 1988. Since 1999, the City of Saint Louis has owned the 14,000-square-foot property through the Land Reutilization Authority. Cleanup of the lot began in 2003. Impressed by how they maintained their DIY skatepark, the City of Saint Louis rented the current site of the Peter Mathews Memorial Skate Garden to the KHVT.

=== Kinghighway D.I.Y. skatespot ===
A group of local skaters between 2009 and 2015 built the Kinghighway D.I.Y. skatespot under the South Kinghshighway viaduct. When the elevated roadway was demolished in July 2015, St. Louis was left with no free public skateparks. The group organized themselves into a non-profit the Kingshighway Vigilante Transitions (KHVT) and petitioned the city for a space to build the first free-to-the-public, legal skate park in the City of St. Louis.

=== Peter Mathews ===
The skate garden was named for Peter Mathews, a local skater who died tragically in a car crash.
