= Bevo Mill, St. Louis =

Neighborhood of St. Louis in Missouri, US

Coordinates: 38.5816°N 90.2672°W

Bevo Mill
- Neighborhood of St. Louis
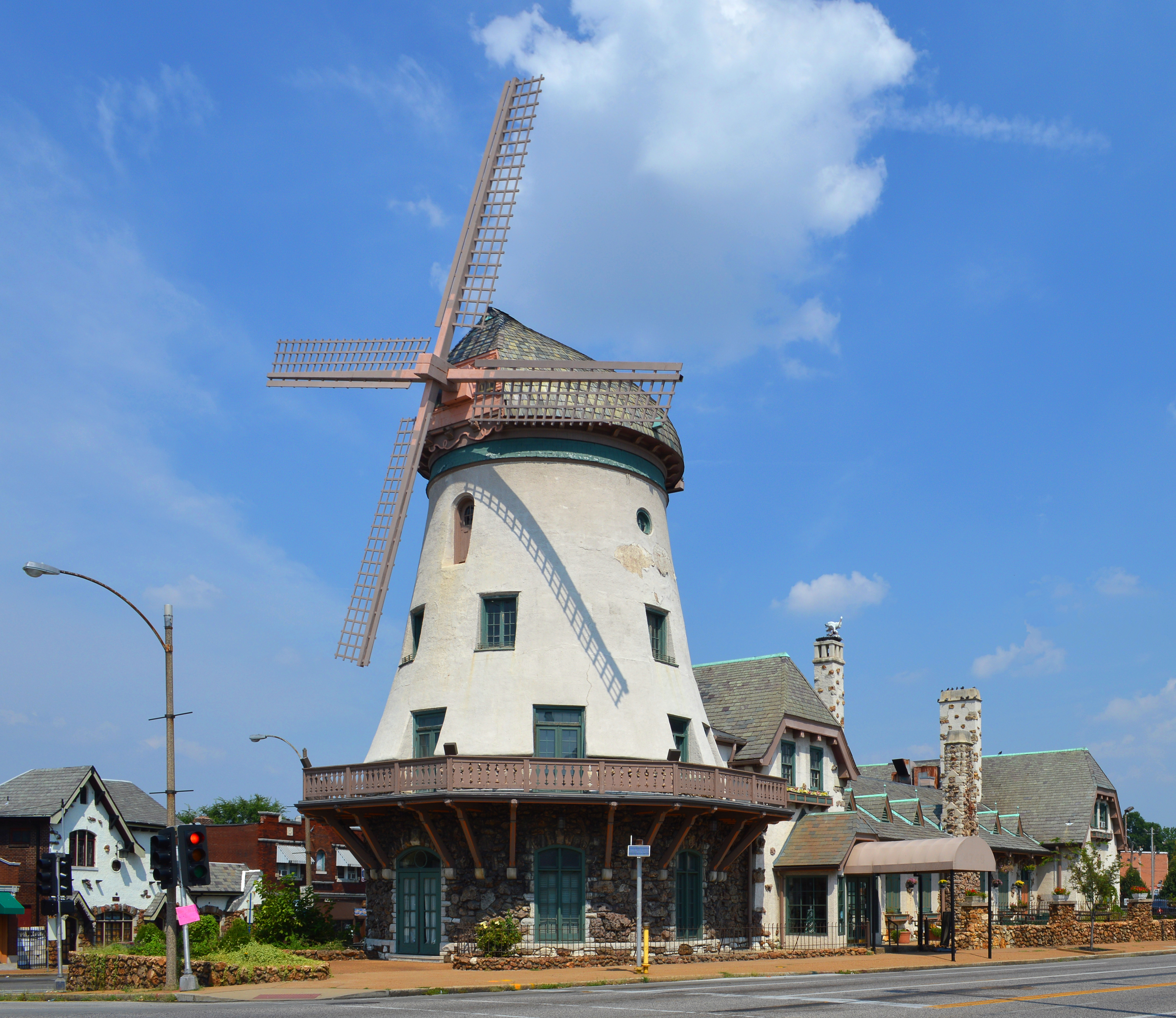
- Bevo Mill, the namesake of the neighborhood

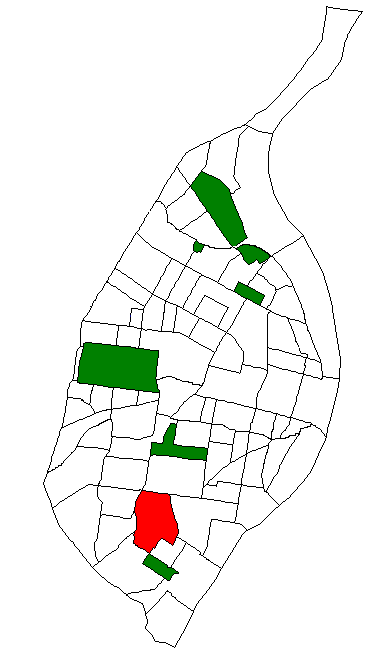
- Location (red) of Bevo Mill within St. Louis
- Country: United States
- State: Missouri
- City: St. Louis
- Wards: 1, 2

Government
  - Alderpersons: Anne Schweitzer, Tom Oldenburg

Area
  - Total: 1.37 sq mi (3.5 km^{2})

Population (2020)
  - Total: 11,941
  - Density: 8,720/sq mi (3,370/km^{2})
- ZIP Code: Part of 63116
- Area code: 314

Bevo Mill is a neighborhood located in south St. Louis, Missouri.

== Populace ==
The Bevo Mill area is direct to the west of the neighborhood of Dutchtown, which was a major center of German settlement in St. Louis in the mid-nineteenth century. After significant population loss in the later twentieth century, the neighborhood was revitalized in the 1990s by immigrants fleeing war in Bosnia and Croatia. Today, much of the Bevo Mill neighborhood is populated with immigrants, particularly Bosnian Americans and Croatian Americans. The St. Louis metro area is now home to an estimated 70,000 Bosnians. The influx of new immigrants has helped stem the decline in St. Louis's population. Many Bosnians have purchased homes in South St. Louis, starting new businesses, including bakeries, cafes, taverns, nightclubs, restaurants, neighborhood grocery stores, and butcher shops, stimulating the economy and transforming the area, once known for crime, into a safe, thriving neighborhood.

== Bevo Mill Restaurant ==
The neighborhood was named after the Bevo Mill, a distinctive restaurant with a windmill and beer hall at Gravois and Morganford roads. The restaurant was opened by August Busch Sr. in 1917 who wished to recreate a European beer garden where drinks would be served in an outdoor atmosphere of music and dancing, like a country club in the City. Busch toured Holland for a year prior to the mill´s erection, seeking authentic artifacts and studying Dutch windmills. A famous feature of Bevo Mill are its porcelain tile murals of idyllic scenes. They were made in Germany about 1890. It is said that Busch paid Tony Faust $50,000 for them after the closing of Faust´s downtown restaurant in 1916. Architects Klipstein and Rothman designed the mill in a Tudor revival style. Bevo Mill is named for a malt beverage that was produced by Anheuser-Busch at the time of the Mill's opening.

The Mill became a City Landmark in 1971 and is located at 4749 Gravois. It was built by Grone Construction, owned by Louis Henry Grone whose cousins owned H. Grone Brewery. It operated under the name Bevo Mill until its closure in 2009. In 2017, a restaurant and event venue named Das Bevo opened at the location. The restaurant and venue remain in operation today with a weekend dining schedule.

== Demographics ==
Historical population
Census	Pop.	Note	%±
1990	13,179		—
2000	13,286		0.8%
2010	12,654		−4.8%
2020	11,941		−5.6%

In 2020, Bevo Mill's racial makeup was 58.3% White, 20.6% Black, 0.6% Native American, 4.8% Asian, 9.9% Two or More Races, and 5.7% Some Other Race. 11.6% of Bevo Mill's population was of Hispanic or Latino origin.

== See also ==
- Holly Hills, St. Louis, southeast of Bevo
- History of Bosnian Americans in St. Louis
- Peter Mathews Memorial Skate Garden
