= Peter Matthews (artist) =

English artist (1978)

Peter Matthews (born October 1978) is an English artist who has developed a practice of creating drawings while immersed in the ocean and paintings created over days or weeks of being in solitude along the Pacific and Atlantic coasts. He works with art materials hiked into the landscape, strapped about his person, hidden in caches along the coast and using found objects on the beach. Since 2007, his drawings made directly in the ocean record the movement of the ocean, the passage and experience of time and the live natural environment that he immerses himself into, often straddling a degree of vulnerability to his being in the process. His work is known as being produced as a lived experience while in nature alone, and he has worked in a diverse range of natural environments in México, Japan, Chile, Costa Rica, England, the U.S., Brazil and Taiwan. He has been identified as being part of a long English tradition of maritime art, whilst his abstract style has been compared to that of American expressionist Jasper Johns. His creative process has occasionally led him into danger, and has resulted in his receiving injuries. Matthews' work has been exhibited internationally, as well as being used to illustrate aspects of scientific research in marine biology.

== Background ==
Big grey seals often pop up," says Matthews, who has been working for years around the Lizard Peninsula in Cornwall, wild-camping on the cliffs near Coverack. "When I'm exhausted and lie on the rocks to try and generate a bit of heat, the seals come up really close. Those unexpected things in nature are fascinating.

Peter Mathews was born in Derby, England in 1978. He spent much of his youth exploring the countryside of Derbyshire and Leicestershire, particularly its woodlands, fields and along the River Trent. Matthews ascribes these early hikes to his attraction to solitude. In an interview with BBC News, he described his feeling of allure to the "mysterious and omnipresent call of the wild." As an artist, however, Matthews calls Cornwall his "ancestral" home. His maternal grandfather "sold fish in Leicester," says Matthews, "so I like to think it's in my roots," on working at sea . Although he personally rejects the description of environmental artist, he has also been called an "ocean based visual artist," and on one occasion even a "mystical waterman." His work, focussed on the sea as it is, has been identified as part of a long tradition of British artists' fascination with the maritime, which includes artists as Turner (Fishermen at Sea and Snow Storm: Steam-Boat off a Harbour's Mouth) and Constable (Seascape Study with Rain Clouds). Andrew Friend, a contemporary of Matthews,' also takes an immersive approach to his own seascapes.

Matthews' original inspiration for his way of working was a 2007 near-death experience. This occurred while he was surfing in the Pacific Ocean on Playa Zipolite in Oaxaca when the sea became increasingly rough and he became separated from his surfboard. He was eventually hit by a rogue wave; by then he was "floundering in the ocean with a gut-wrenching sense of fear, being completely at the mercy of the ocean," he later recalled.

== Technique ==
Matthews' Interim (2017), created using oil, acrylic, pencil and oil bar on canvas, illustrates his technique.

Matthews' has created his work in the Earth's oceans, Cornwall, Hawaii, and Taiwan. In doing so, he can spend long periods—ranging from hours to days— floating or submerging in the ocean. He keeps his artistic media either cached in his hat or strapped to his wrists or ankles. This includes charcoal and gel pens, and the surfaces he draws on can range from paper to canvas sheeting, pinned to "old piece of plywood" which acts both as a drawing board and a floatation device. Working this way, it has been said, helps Matthews try and capture the state of suspension people feel while they are bobbing in the water. This method also allows him to explore—in his words—"the fluid midpoint between sea and land, thought and form." Matthews often enters the water at dawn and may stay immersed until nightfall, and effectively "lets the ocean do the work for him"; sometimes the work is left exposed to the elements and tides overnight in which the piece continues its natural development. Matthews has described himself as merely being the "instrument" by which the sea "draw[s] itself."

Matthews' work has itself encountered danger, having been buried on a beach by a mudslide (never to be found again) and on other occasions being swept away or sinking in the sea. Problems Matthews personally faces are those of his environment—he has suffered numbness, hypothermia and sunstroke, as well as receiving dog-, snake-, jellyfish- and insect-bites. As a result, his working method has been described "eccentric." To get himself in the mindset to create the piece entitled With the Forces of the Pacific and Atlantic Oceans, Matthews constructed a speaker system out of a CD player and a tripod. He then played himself recordings of the sound of the Pacific Ocean over a period of days, floating in the Atlantic Ocean. On one occasion Matthews submerged himself to the ocean bed where he used waterproof ink on canvasses weighted down with rocks, whilst, when in California, he slept in the Californian desert and painted with "one of the blackest paints on Earth."

== Reception ==
For A Mystical Exchange of Energies he sprayed nine litres of Pacific ocean, collected during typhoon Nanmodal in August 2011, into the Atlantic using a fire extinguisher—transferring one ocean into the other.

Matthews has exhibited internationally since 2003 after graduating with an MA in Fine Art from the Nottingham Trent University, with sale prices in the Saatchi Gallery reaching thousands of pounds. He has exhibited large-scale paintings at the John Moores Painting Prize held at the Walker Art Gallery in Liverpool in 2018 and 2021. He has shown his work in group exhibitions with artists such as Richard Long, Anselm Kiefer, Giuseppe Penone, Ana Mendieta, Bill Viola, Felix Gonzalez-Torres and many others. Matthews has shown his art at numerous galleries, museums and institutions including the Drawing Center, New York; The North Carolina Museum of Contemporary Art; the National Maritime Museum, London; the Royal Academy of Arts, London; the Ikon Gallery, Birmingham; the Künstlerforum Bonn, Bonn, Germany; the Saatchi Gallery, London, the James Cohan Gallery, New York and Mendes Wood DM in São Paulo, Brazil amongst others. He has lectured for university audiences (at, for instance, the University of California, San Diego), and was the artist-in-residence at the Scripps Institution of Oceanography.

Matthews' style has been compared—in its "scratchy, abstract" nature—with the work of Cy Twombly and Jasper Johns, but with a greater degree of stream of consciousness, often bordering "the brilliant and the ridiculous." Other critic's comments have described his work as "mind-boggling oceanography with Native American mythology, plus a splash of quirky inventiveness," and as being "nervously textured." The University of California, San Diego has used Matthews work as an example of how popular interest in subjects such as marine biology and maritime history can be developed and encouraged.
