= Bosnian diaspora =

People of Bosnian heritage who live outside Bosnia and Herzegovina

World map of the Bosnian diaspora. Bosnia and Herzegovina + 100,000 + 10,000 + 1,000

The Bosnian diaspora consists of Bosnian emigrants of all ethnicities and their descendants in countries such as the United States, United Kingdom, Canada, Germany, Sweden, Switzerland, Australia and elsewhere. There are an estimated 2 million Bosnians living outside Bosnia and Herzegovina.

== Causes ==
The Bosnian diaspora was the consequence of either voluntary departure, coercion and/or forced migrations or expulsions that occurred on several occasions since the 1870s:

- In the late 19th century to the east and west caused by the invading forces of the Austro-Hungarian Empire.
- In the 20th century (1919-1970s) caused by Yugoslavian Emigration programs with Turkey
- The Bosnian War in the early 1990s (from 1992 to 1995). Many Bosnian refugees sought asylum in the United States, Canada, Australia, New Zealand, Germany, Sweden, Austria.
