= PEN Bosnia and Herzegovina =

P.E.N. Centar u Bosni i Hercegovini П.Е.Н. Центар у Босни и Херцеговини
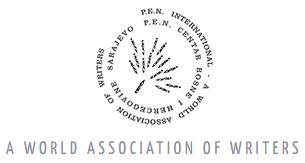
- The logo of the PEN Bosnia and Herzegovina
- Predecessor: PEN Yugoslavia
- Formation: 1992
- Type: Non-profit Organization, Literary society, Lobbying
- Legal status: Association
- Purpose: Publication, Advocacy, Lobbying, Literary Awards
- Headquarters: Sarajevo, Bosnia and Herzegovina
- Location: Vrazova 1, Sarajevo, 71000, Bosnia and Herzegovina
- Coordinates: 43.856506°N 18.411833°E
- Region served: Bosnia and Herzegovina
- Official language: Bosnian, Croatian, Serbian (Serbo-Croatian)
- Key people: Board of Directors
- Parent organization: International PEN
- Affiliations: International Freedom of Expression Exchange
- Website: penbih.ba
- Remarks: PEN Bosnia and Herzegovina is the representative of International Pen, for whole of Bosnia and Herzegovina

PEN Center of Bosnia and Herzegovina (P.E.N. Centar u Bosni i Hercegovini / П.Е.Н. Центар у Босни и Херцеговини) is one of the 148 centres of PEN International, and is based in Sarajevo, Bosnia and Herzegovina. It was founded in the first year of the war in Bosnia, on 31 October 1992. As part of Yugoslavia, Bosnia and Herzegovina didn't have the right for membership as an independent center, according to the rules of the International PEN.

== History ==
PEN Center of Bosnia and Herzegovina is one of the 148 centres of PEN International, and is based in Sarajevo, Bosnia and Herzegovina. The founding assembly was convened on 31 October 1992, and held in Holiday Inn Hotel in Sarajevo, under heavy shelling as the Bosnian war and the Siege of Sarajevo already started. Thirty-six writers managed to reach the Holiday Inn Hotel that day, and decided to establish the association. Because of the war-related circumstances, PEN of Bosnia and Herzegovina was temporarily represented by PEN Center of the Republic of Slovenia in international contacts and relations. PEN Center of the Republic of Slovenia also helped in organizing and collecting aid for the writers, artists and intellectuals of Sarajevo during the siege, which was delivered to the city under difficult circumstances.

The admission of the Bosnian and Herzegovinian PEN was plebiscitarily confirmed at a congress in Spain in the autumn of 1993, however, Bosnian writers could not attend, because they were not able to safely exit the besieged city. The PEN delegation of Bosnia and Herzegovina finally managed to attend the congress of the PEN in Prague in the fall of 1994.

== Function ==
The center serves on the association and for the benefit of its members – writers, journalists, editors, publishers, publicists, literary critics and historians, literary translators, and other intellectuals and authors, representing their interests in cooperation with an authorities and organizations in the country and abroad, with the aim of "affirming and promoting literature, tolerance, culture of dialogue and freedom of expression in accordance with the Charter of the International P.E.N. Organizations".

== Novi Izraz magazine ==
The literary magazine “Novi Izraz” (the “New Expression”), is organization's main publication, and is more than 60 years old.

== See also ==
- List of archives in Bosnia and Herzegovina
- Gazi Husrev-beg Library
- Vijećnica
- Oriental Institute in Sarajevo
- National and University Library of the Republika Srpska
- National and University Library of Bosnia and Herzegovina
