= Aleksandra Čvorović =

Serbian writer, librarian and journalist

- Александра Чворовић
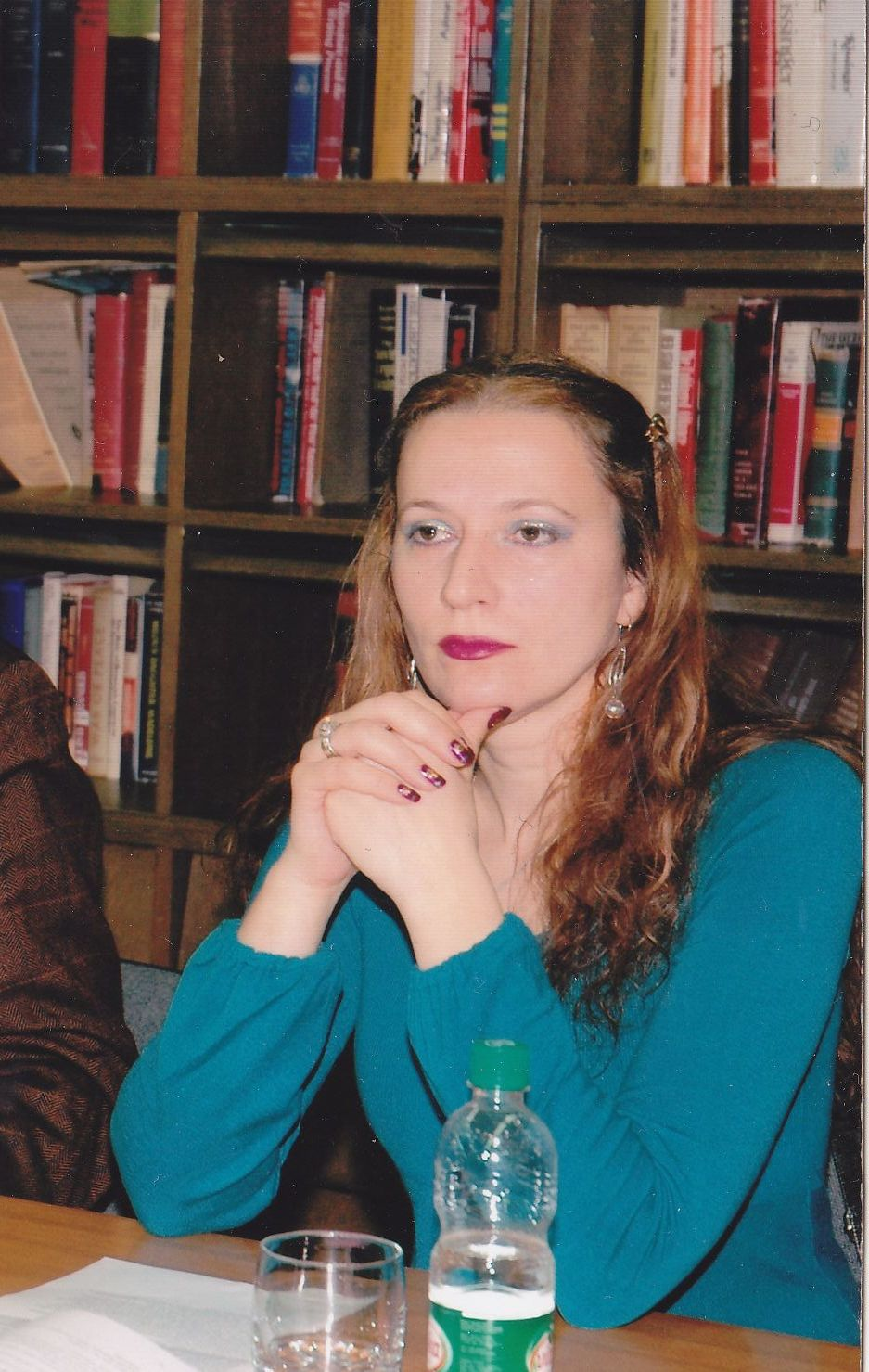
- Čvorović in 2011
- Born: 10 February 1976 (age 50); Banja Luka, SR Bosnia and Herzegovina, SFR Yugoslavia
- Occupations: Writer, journalist and librarian
- Known for: Whisper of Clay Giants (poetry), Magical Rose (fairy tales)

Aleksandra Čvorović (Serbian Cyrillic: Александра Чворовић; born 10 February 1976) is a writer, journalist and librarian from Bosnia and Herzegovina. Her works have been translated from Serbo-Croatian into several other languages.

== Background ==
Čvorović was born on 10 February 1976 in Banja Luka, Bosnia and Herzegovina (then part of Yugoslavia). She studied literature at the University of Banja Luka and obtained her master in library studies at the University of Belgrade.

== Career ==
Čvorović has published poetry, short stories, and children's books, including the volumes "Magical Rose" and "Overcoming". She has also been included in anthologies such as "Banja Luka Manuscripts" and "Anthology of Serbian Poetry". Her works have been translated into English, German, Polish, Danish, Slovenian and Hungarian. Additionally, she has worked as a journalist, essayist, and editor-in-chief for literary journals such as Putevi, Književnik, Diwan, and Album.

As a children's writer, she has visited kindergartens in Banja Luka to expose the preschoolers to literature. According to Čvorović, the visits are important because they are normally a child's first encounter with a writer. She has also authored several research papers on children's literature.

In addition to her literary career, Čvorović has worked as a children's library coordinator, heading workshops in creative writing. She is employed by the National and University Library of the Republika Srpska, where she organizes cultural and educational activities.

Čvorović has participated in various literature events and festivals in Bosnia and Herzegovina, Serbia, Montenegro, Slovenia, the Netherlands, and Denmark. Since April 2018, she has been a member of the presidency of the Association of Writers of Bosnia and Herzegovina. She also belongs to the Association of Writers of Republika Srpska.

== Awards ==
Čvorović received a "Ljupko Račić" prize from the Gradačac literary meetings, as well as an award from the Government of Republika Srpska. In 2014, she won a "Stanko Rakita" prize for her book "Magical Rose", from the Banja Luka branch of the Association of Writers of Republika Srpska. That same year, she also earned a "Slovo Podgrmeča" award for her book of poetry called "Overcoming".

== Bibliography ==
- The Poet from Unknown Town, Style Writes Now (14 March 2017), ASIN B06XP1VPKM
- Magical Rose, House of Poetry, Banja Luka, 2014 (children's book)
- Overcoming, House of Poetry, Banja Luka, 2013 (poetry)
- Flower at the Gate of the Dream, Institute for Textbooks and Teaching Resources, Istočno Sarajevo, 2007 (poetry)
- Monologue in Coffee Cup, Public Library Alija Isaković, Gradačac, 2006 (short stories)
- An Angel Under the Bed, KOV Vršac, 2002 (poetry)
- Whisper of Clay Giants, Glas srpski Banja Luka, 2000 (poetry)
