= Izet Sarajlić =

Bosnian writer (1930–2002)

Izet Sarajlić Изет Сарајлић
- Born: 30 March 1930 Doboj, Yugoslavia
- Died: 2 May 2002 (aged 72) Sarajevo, Bosnia and Herzegovina
- Occupation: Poet
- Genre: Poetry; prose; translations; history of philosophy

Izet Sarajlić (Serbo-Croatian Cyrillic: Изет Сарајлић; 16 March 1930 – 2 May 2002) was a Bosnian poet. He was Bosnia and Herzegovina's best-known poet after World War II, and the Yugoslavia's most widely translated poet.

== Biography ==
He was born in Doboj on March 16, 1930. His mother was not yet eighteen when she married his father, a railway worker. Sarajlić's childhood was spent in Trebinje and Dubrovnik; he moved to Sarajevo in 1945, where he would remain for the rest of his life.

In Sarajevo, Sarajlić attended the boys’ gymnasium, and would enter the world of Yugoslav poetry at age nineteen with the collection, "U susretu" ("In meeting"). He graduated with a degree in philosophy at the University of Sarajevo's department of philosophy and comparative literature, later receiving a PhD in philosophical sciences. During his studies at university, Sarajlić worked as a journalist.

After graduating, Sarajlić became a full-time professor at the Faculty of Humanities in Sarajevo, a position he would hold for the rest of his life. He was a member of both the ANUBiH and the Association of Writers of Bosnia and Herzegovina, as well as the association of intellectuals, Krug 99 (Circle 99). He founded Sarajevo Poetry Days as an international literary festival in 1962. Also, in 1992 he founded the PEN Bosnia and Herzegovina.

During his lengthy career, Sarajlić published over 30 books of poetry, some of which have been translated into European languages (Macedonian, Russian, Turkish, Slovenian, English, Albanian, Lithuanian, German, Spanish, Polish, Italian, Dutch and French), as well as numerous memoirs, political writings and translations.

Sarajlić's manuscript "Sarajevska ratna zbirka" ("Sarajevo War Journal"), written during the first weeks of the siege of Sarajevo, was published in 1993 in Slovenia. When talking about it, Sarajlić would say, "This is the only collection of which I can say that I would love never to have written it." He believed that he "belonged to the 20th century." When the 21st century arrived, he would date letters to friends as "1999+1," "1999+2," etc.

He died in Sarajevo on 2 May 2002, at the age of 72.

== Works ==
=== Poetry ===
- U susretu (Sarajevo, 1949)
- Sivi vikend (Sarajevo, 1955)
- Minutu ćutanja (Sarajevo, 1960)
- Posveta (Belgrade, 1961)
- Tranzit (Sarajevo, 1963)
- Intermeco (Kruševac, 1965)
- Godine, godine (Belgrade, 1965)
- Ipak elegija (Beograd, 1967)
- Vilsonovo šetalište (Sarajevo 1969)
- Stihovi za laku noć (Belgrade, 1971)
- Pisma (Sarajevo, 1974)
- Trinaest knjižica poezije (Priština, 1978)
- Neko je zvonio (Čačak, 1982)
- Nekrolog slavuju (Belgrade, 1987)
- Oproštaj sa evropskim humanističkim idealizmom (Nikšić, 1989)
- Sarajevska ratna zbirka (Sarajevo, 1992)
- Knjiga oproštaja (Sarajevo, 1996)
- 30. februar (Sarajevo, 1998)

=== Prose ===
- Portreti drugova (Sarajevo, 1965)
- Koga će sutra voziti taksisti (Sarajevo, 1974)
- V.P. (Sarajevo, 1999)

=== Poetry and prose ===
- Putujem i govorim (Sarajevo, 1967)
- Slavim, Podgorica, 1988.

=== Translates ===
- Knjiga prijatelja (Sarajevo, 1981)

=== Philosophy ===
- Filozofijska i sociologijska bibliografija SRH od 1945-1962 (Belgrade, 1966)
- Franciskus Patricijus (Belgrade, 1968)
- Patricijeva filozofija bitka (Zagreb, 1970)
- Biće beskonačnog (Sarajevo, 1973)
- Hrestomatija etičkih tekstova patristike-skolastike renesanse (Sarajevo, 1978)
- Pohvala filodoksiji (Sarajevo, 1978)
- Patricijeva kritika Aristotelesa (Zenica, 1996)
- Logos u Herakleitosa (Sarajevo, 1997)

== Awards and recognition ==
- Award of the Union of Jewish Municipalities of Yugoslavia (1971)
- 27th of July Award (1963)
- Dis Award (1982)
- Zmaj Award (1984)
- Branko Miljković Award (1987)
- ZAVNOBiH Lifetime Achievement Award, 1989.
- Fund for Free Expression Award U.S.A. (1993)
- Mediterranneo Award (1997)
- Erguvan Award (1997)
- Premio Finaleinsieme (1998)
- Alberto Moravia Award (2001)
- Sixth of April Sarajevo Award, 2002.
- Honorary Citizen of Salerno (2002)

Preceded by	President of the Association of Writers of Bosnia and Herzegovina; 1970–1970	Succeeded by
