= Sarajevo Poetry Days =

Festival in Bosnia and Herzegovina

- Status: active
- Genre: Literary festival
- Location: Sarajevo
- Country: Bosnia and Herzegovina
- Years active: 1962 - present
- Founder: Izet Sarajlić
- Website: sadapoezije.ba

Sarajevo Poetry Days (Bosnian: Sarajevski dani poezije / Сарајевски дани поезије) is an international literary festival held annually in Sarajevo, Bosnia and Herzegovina. It was established in 1962 by Bosnian poet, Izet Sarajlić, who was then-member of the Association of Writers of Bosnia and Herzegovina. The festival is the oldest living literary festival in Bosnia and Herzegovina.

== History and purpose ==
The festival was founded with the aim of preserving and enhancing the literary-aesthetic and literary-ethical standards of the written word in Bosnia and Herzegovina. Despite the siege of Sarajevo during the Bosnian War (1992–1995), the festival continued to be held.

== Program and activities ==
Sarajevo Poetry Days features a diverse program that includes poetry readings, literary discussions, writing workshops, exhibitions, and book promotions. Events are hosted in various cultural venues across Sarajevo, such as the Museum of Literature and Performing Arts. The festival also extends to other cities in Bosnia and Herzegovina, including Mostar, Tuzla, Goražde, and Kakanj.

A central feature of the festival is the awarding of the annual "Bosnian Stećak" literary prize, given for outstanding contributions to poetry. Past recipients have included renowned international poets such as Mahmoud Darwish, Charles Simic, and Hussein Habasch.

== International participation ==
Over the decades, Sarajevo Poetry Days has hosted writers and poets from a wide range of countries, including Switzerland, Sweden, Germany, Iran, and the United States. Among the international guests have been Ilma Rakusa, Luis J. Rodriguez, and numerous poets from the Versopolis European poetry platform.

== Organization ==
The festival is organized by the Association of Writers of Bosnia and Herzegovina, the country’s oldest professional literary organization, which was founded in 1945.
