= List of archives in Bosnia and Herzegovina =

This is list of archives in Bosnia and Herzegovina.

== Archives in Bosnia and Herzegovina ==
- Archives of Bosnia and Herzegovina
- Archives of Republika Srpska
- Archives of the Federation of Bosnia and Herzegovina
- Archives of Brčko District
- Historical Archive of the City of Sarajevo
- Archives of the Tuzla Canton
- Archives of Una-Sana Canton
- Archives of Herzegovina-Neretva Canton
- Archives of Bosnian-Podrinje Canton
- County Archive of Široki Brijeg
- Ottoman Archives fund

== See also ==
- List of archives
- List of libraries in Bosnia and Herzegovina
- List of museums in Bosnia and Herzegovina
- Culture of Bosnia and Herzegovina
