= Adamir Jerković =

Bosnian academic and sociologist

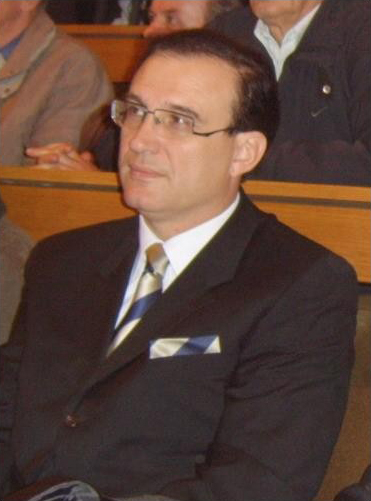
- Born: 22 February 1958 (age 68); Zenica, SR Bosnia and Herzegovina, SFR Yugoslavia
- Citizenship: Bosnian
- Occupations: Secretary General of the Bosniak Academy of Sciences and Arts

Adamir Jerković is a Bosnian-Herzegovinian academic, a doctor of sociology and history, essayist, and publicist with an extensive experience in the field of journalism. He is the author of numerous political commentaries. He served as an advisor to the first President of Bosnia and Herzegovina Alija Izetbegović. He held important political, state and economic posts, including those of the Secretary of the Municipal Conference of the Socialist Alliance of Working People of Zenica, Advisor to the Government of the Federation of Bosnia and Herzegovina, Assistant to the General Director of BH Pošte, Director of the Archives of the Federation of Bosnia and Herzegovina, President of the Administrative Board of the Poštanska /Post Bank, and performed many other duties. He is the Secretary General of the Bosniak Academy of Sciences and Arts. He is the author of numerous books, essays, and articles.

== Biography ==
Adamir Jerković was born 22 February 1958 in Zenica, SR Bosnia and Herzegovina, SFR Yugoslavia, as the firstborn son of Hasan and Sevleta Jerković. After completing primary school "Rade Kondić" in Nemila, he enrolled in "29. November" grammar school in Zenica. He graduated from the Faculty of Law of the University in Sarajevo. He obtained a Master's degree in history from the Faculty of Philosophy in Sarajevo and earned a doctorate in sociological sciences/history.

Adamir Jerković was involved in journalism since his student days. He started his career in Zenica-based newspaper "Our Word" in 1976 for which he wrote a feuilleton entitled "Towards Colombo", dealing with participating countries at the 5th Summit of the Non-Aligned Movement held from on 16 to 19 August 1976 in Colombo, Sri Lanka. He started working at Radio Zenica in 1977, going through all professional stages, from being a reporter to editor-in-chief. In 1989, he became the Secretary of the Presidency of the OK SSRNJ Zenica (Socialist Alliance of the Working People of Yugoslavia) and he held this post when he ran for the Mayor of the Zenica Municipality. Following the decision to organize multi-party elections in 1990, he participated as the list leader of the DSS – Democratic Socialist Alliance (successor to the Republican Conference of the Socialist Alliance of Working People of Bosnia and Herzegovina). He was elected member of the Council of the Municipality of Zenica, but he resigned soon afterwards. He worked as a journalist for many years- he was a correspondent of RTV Sarajevo, and, during the aggression on Bosnia and Herzegovina, the editor-in-chief of Zenica Region TV – ITC RTV BiH. He authored numerous analytical articles and editorials for the local and foreign media. He actively worked on breaking the media blockade in which he eventually succeeded. He edited the famous and popular political show "Meetings of the Worlds" which was broadcast weekly by Radio Zenica. In addition to analyses of events, the show used its foreign correspondents to monitor developments related to Bosnia and Herzegovina in the global centers of political power. After the war, he moved to the foreign news desk of the Radio-Television of Bosnia and Herzegovina (RTVBiH), where he served as a commentator.

=== Advisor to President Alija Izetbegović ===
In 1997, President of Bosnia and Herzegovina, Alija Izetbegović, appointed Adamir Jerković as his advisor. After that, he underwent PR professional training at the State Department in Washington. He was a member of the government delegation during bilateral meetings with heads of state, prime ministers and world leaders, as well as at international conferences dedicated to Bosnia and Herzegovina, from various donor conferences to the Stability Pact for South Eastern Europe conference of 30 July 1999. At the time of need for strengthening the Bosnian institutions and as a person with an international PR certificate, he was appointed the first spokesman of the Presidency of Bosnia and Herzegovina. He headed the delegations in the country and abroad. He was a personal and special envoy of the Chairman of the Presidency of Bosnia and Herzegovina Alija Izetbegović with several heads of state.

He is the first Bosnian-Herzegovinian official who visited the People's Republic of China in September 2000. As a special envoy of Alija Izetbegović, he carried a written note to the President of China and the General Secretary of the Chinese Communist Party, Jiang Zemin. His hosts were Qian Qichen, the Vice President of the State Council, and a member of the Politburo of the Chinese Communist Party. Adamir Jerković informed them of Bosnia and Herzegovina's position on the unity of China.

The Chinese promised to triple their aid to Bosnia and Herzegovina, which they did. Shortly after that, the PRC invested substantial funds in the construction of infrastructure facilities and provision of aid to refugees, and an improvement was made in the BiH – Chinese relations in this period.

After the withdrawal of the President Alija Izetbegović from active politics on 14 October 2000, he remained an Advisor to the new Member of the BiH Presidency, Halid Genjac. Under the decision of the representatives of the international community in Bosnia and Herzegovina, Halid Genjac was to remain a Member of the BiH presidency only until 30 March 2001. when Beriz Belkić of the Party for Bosnia and Herzegovina was to replace him. He remained an advisor to Belkić as well, after which he was appointed the chief of staff of the Member of the BiH Presidency. He kept his post at the Presidency of Bosnia and Herzegovina until 31 January 2002. Subsequently, he participated in international conferences dedicated to the life and work of the first President of Bosnia and Herzegovina, which, following the passing of Alija Izetbegović, are regularly organized in Turkey and he participated in similar conferences in Cairo and Priština and at the IUS University of Sarajevo.

Under the Decision of the Government of the Federation of Bosnia and Herzegovina of 24 March 2000 24 March 2000, he was appointed the President of the Board of the Poštanska Banka BiH / Postbank BiH and held this post for two years with outstanding results. During his term of office, he managed to open branches in Sarajevo and Živinice. During this period, Postbank was 100% state-owned and it recorded good financial results After the end of his term at the Presidency of BiH, he was chosen to participate in the first management of a new enterprise – Public Utility BH Pošta, at which he served as Assistant general manager. After this, he held the post of the advisor for legal and economic affairs to the Federal Minister of Labor and Social Policy from 2003 to 2007.

=== Reformer of the Archives of the Federation of BiH ===
As part of the regular public vacancy procedure, he was appointed as the Director of the Archives of the Federation of Bosnia and Herzegovina on April 26, 2007. There, he found severely dysfunctional working relations, but soon enough he managed to establish good working atmosphere and remarkable work and technological discipline. His term ended in 2020 with the highest governmental commendations. During his tenure as Director of the Archives of the Federation of Bosnia and Herzegovina, he organized a large international exhibition on the genocide in Srebrenica in some thirty capitals of Europe, Asia, and Africa..

He played a significant role in establishing international relations between the archives and archival institutions across the globe. He was a speaker at major international archival conferences in Moscow, Cairo, Warsaw, Tbilisi, Vilnius, Vilnius, Tallinn, Riga, Istanbul, Sarajevo, and organized and prepared large international exhibitions, including Sarajevo Assassination; The Great War (1914-1918); Turkey and World War I; Mostar 20 years later; The Congress of Berlin of 1878 and Bosnia and Herzegovina; 70 Years since the Victory over the Cominform; November 25 - ZAVNOBiH and the Restoration of the Statehood of Bosnia and Herzegovina, among others. These exhibitions were presented on four continents.

During the protests in Sarajevo and arson which took place in the Presidency of Bosnia and Herzegovina on 7 February 2014, complete documentation and entire fonds of the Archives of the Federation of Bosnia and Herzegovina were saved thanks to his consistent work on ensuring adequate anti-fire and anti-burglary protection.

Upon his initiative, on January 8, 2016 the Government of the Federation of Bosnia and Herzegovina adopted the Regulation on the seal of the Archives of the Federation and archival awards: King Tvrtko I Kotromanić, Bosnian Stećak, and Charter of Ban Kulin. Adamir Jerković is the conceptual creator of the logo.

He has been the president of the Commission for Taking Archival Professional Exam in the FBiH since 2007, and from 2009 onwards he has been the chairman of the board of the Association of Archival and Administrative Workers of the Federation of Bosnia and Herzegovina, one of two professional association of archivists. From 2007 to 2020, he served as the President of the Commission for the Archivist Professional Examination in the Federation of Bosnia and Herzegovina. Since 2009, he worked as the President of the Board of Directors of the Association of Archival and Administrative Workers of the Federation of Bosnia and Herzegovina..

Currently, he is the Secretary General of the Bosniak Academy of Sciences and Arts and a professor at the University of Novi Pazar.

== Bibliography (Books) ==
- Book Alija Upclose (in Bosnian: Alija izbliza, Алија изблиза). The book was published in three tomes and has received a lot of publicity. Its promotion was attended by thousands of visitors. This trilogy had 55 promotions throughout Bosnia and Herzegovina, Slovenia, Croatia, Kosovo and Turkey. These books are found in numerous international libraries, in Prague, Cairo, Warsaw, Istanbul, Zagreb, Rijeka, Zadar, Maribor and other cities.
- Book Remembering Alija Izetbegovića (in Bosnian: Sjećanja na Aliju Izetbegovića, Cећања на Aлиjy Изетбеговићa) was published on the occasion of the 85th anniversary of the birth of Alija Izetbegovic. The author discussed the first President of Bosnia and Herzegovina with the presidents of state, prime ministers and prominent citizens of the world. These books are found in many cities of the world such as: Vilnius, Chisinau, Tallinn, Riga, Tbilisi, Istanbul, Adana and others. Publisher: Almada, Sarajevo, 2010.
- Co-author Of book "Bosnia, here and now" (in Bosnian: "Bosna, ovdje i sada"). The book was presented to the heads of state and the participants of the international conference of the Stability Pact for South Eastern Europe which was held on 30 July 1999.
- Editor-in-chief of the book "Annals of the Archives of the Federation of Bosnia and Herzegovina", (eleven books, 1-11)which has been published annually and it is in eight editions so far.
- JERKOVIĆ, Adamir (2011): THE RULE OF ALIJA IZETBEGOVIĆ IN THE INDEPENDENCE OF BOSNIA AND HERZEGOVINA, Cairo, Egipat, English – Arap, Archives of the Federation of Bosnia and Herzegovina, Sarajevo.
- JERKOVIĆ, Adamir (2014)SARAJEVSKI ATENTAT /SARAJEVO ASSASSINATION, photomonography, Archives of the Federation of Bosnia and Herzegovina, Sarajevo.
- JERKOVIĆ, Adamir (2015): ARCHIVES AS INSTITUTIONS WHICH PROVIDE SERVICES TO CITIZENS, English, Archives of the Federation of Bosnia and Herzegovina, Sarajevo.
- JERKOVIĆ, Adamir (2016): CONTINUITY OF GREATER SERBIA HEGEMONISTIC POLITICS THROUGH AGGRESSION AND PERHIDIOUS LAND GRABBING TROUGH AGRARIAN REFORMS AND COLONISATION (Kontinuitet velikosrpske hegemonističke politike kroz agresije i perfidne otimačine zemlje putem agrarnih reformi i kolonizacija), English, Archives of the Federation of Bosnia and Herzegovina, Sarajevo.
- JERKOVIĆ, Adamir (2017) ALIJA IZETBEGOVIĆ AND SREBRENICA, BOSNIAN PROSEPECTS AFTER THE GENOCIDE (Alija Izetbegović i Srebrenica, bosanske perspektive poslije genocida), English and Turkish, Bursa, Turkey, Archives of the Federation of Bosnia and Herzegovina, Sarajevo.
- JERKOVIĆ, Adamir (2017) ALIJA IZETBEGOVIĆ, THOUGHTS AND STRUGGLE, engleski i turski, Archives of the Federation of Bosnia and Herzegovina.
- JERKOVIĆ, Adamir (2019) UČITELJI U ADMINISTRATIVNOM SOCIJALIZMU (Teachers in Administrative Socialism), book, Bosnian language, publisher: Archives of the Federation of Bosnia and Herzegovina, ISBN 978-9926-8316-1-5 Sarajevo.
- JERKOVIĆ, Adamir (2019): ZLATNE GODINE (Golden Years),Bosnian-English, Archives of the Federation of Bosnia and Herzegovina, ISBN 978-9926-8316-0-8 Sarajevo.
- JERKOVIĆ, Adamir (2020):DOSIJE O VREMENU SLAVNOM (Dossier about the Glorious Times), Bosnian-English, Dobra knjiga, ISBN 978-9958-27-553-1, Sarajevo.
- JERKOVIĆ, Adamir (2022): MAGLE NAD BOSNOM (Mist over Bosnia), Almada ISBN 978-9958-846-01-4, Sarajevo.

== Honours, decorations, awards and distinctions ==
Jerković received multiple awards for his journalist work and won the first prize of the Association of Journalists of Bosnia and Herzegovina from Zenica "Golden Pen" on two occasions (in 1981 and 1983), as well as Silver Plaque "Metalurg" (in 1983).

He also received the most important archival recognition awarded by the Archives of the Federation of BiH, "King Tvrtko the First Kotromanić Plaque", for the international presentation of Bosnia and Herzegovina, general contribution to the archives as well as the stabilization of the Archives of the Federation of BiH. This award was established in 2016 as a recognition which encompasses all of Bosnia and Herzegovina.

== Other ==
He was elected to the Assembly of the Islamic Community in Bosnia and Herzegovina in 2023.

Jerković has been a member of the Managing Board of the Institute for Research of Genocide from Canada since 2010

He is fluent in English and German.

Gallery of Adamir Jerković
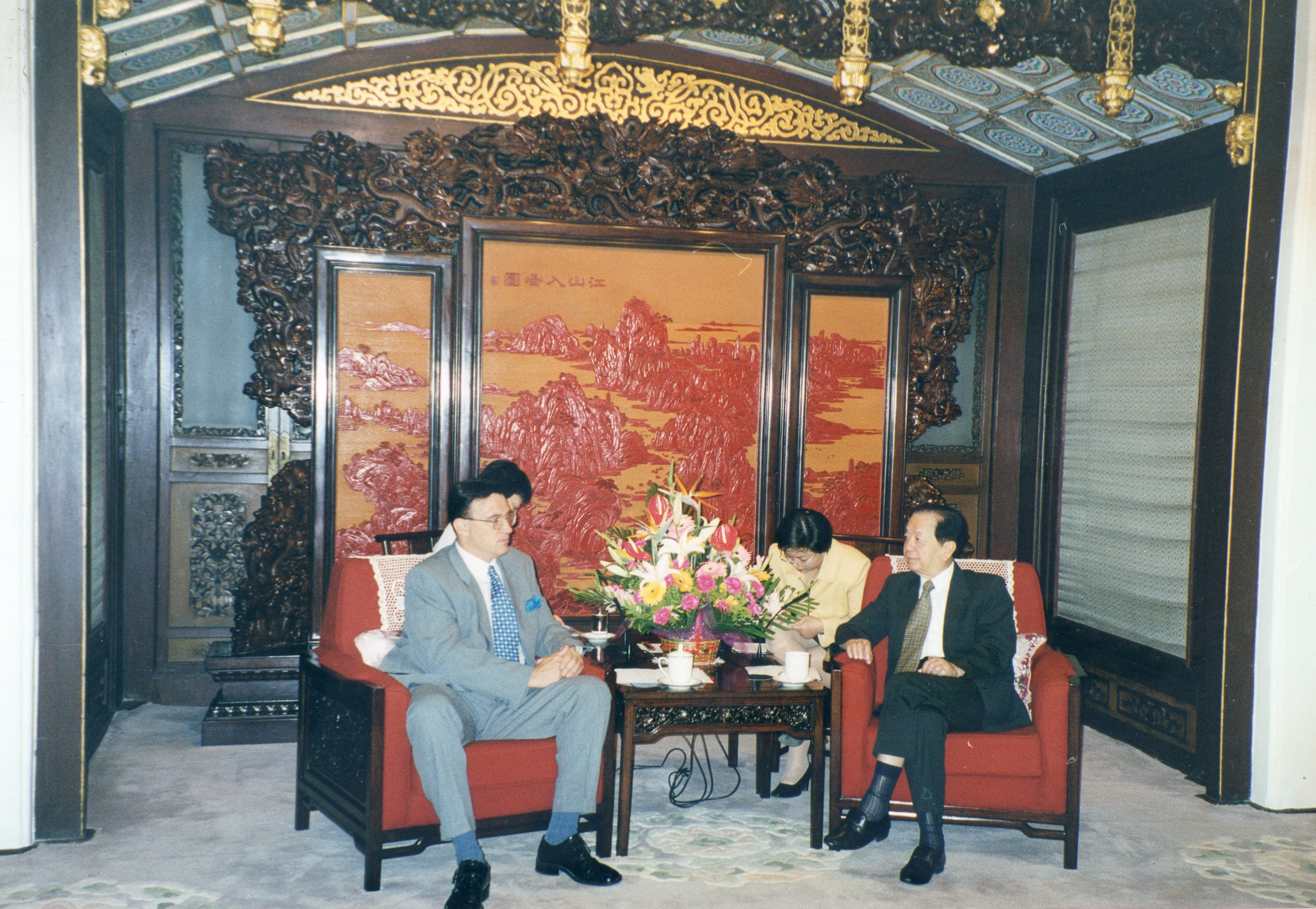
Jerković (left) was admitted to the party and state complex in Zhongnanhai, China.

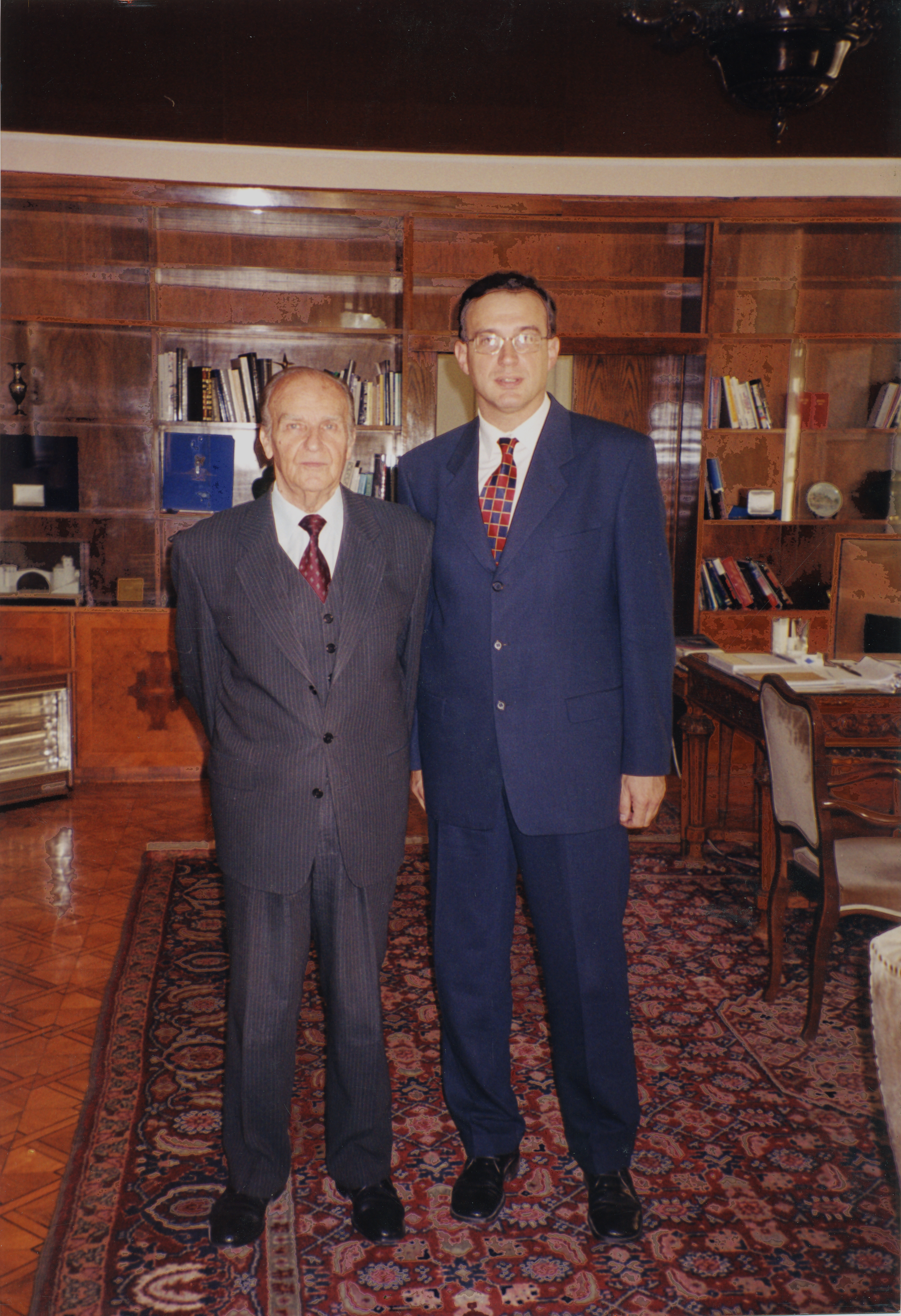
Jerković (right) and former President of Bosnia and Herzegovina Alija Izetbegović.

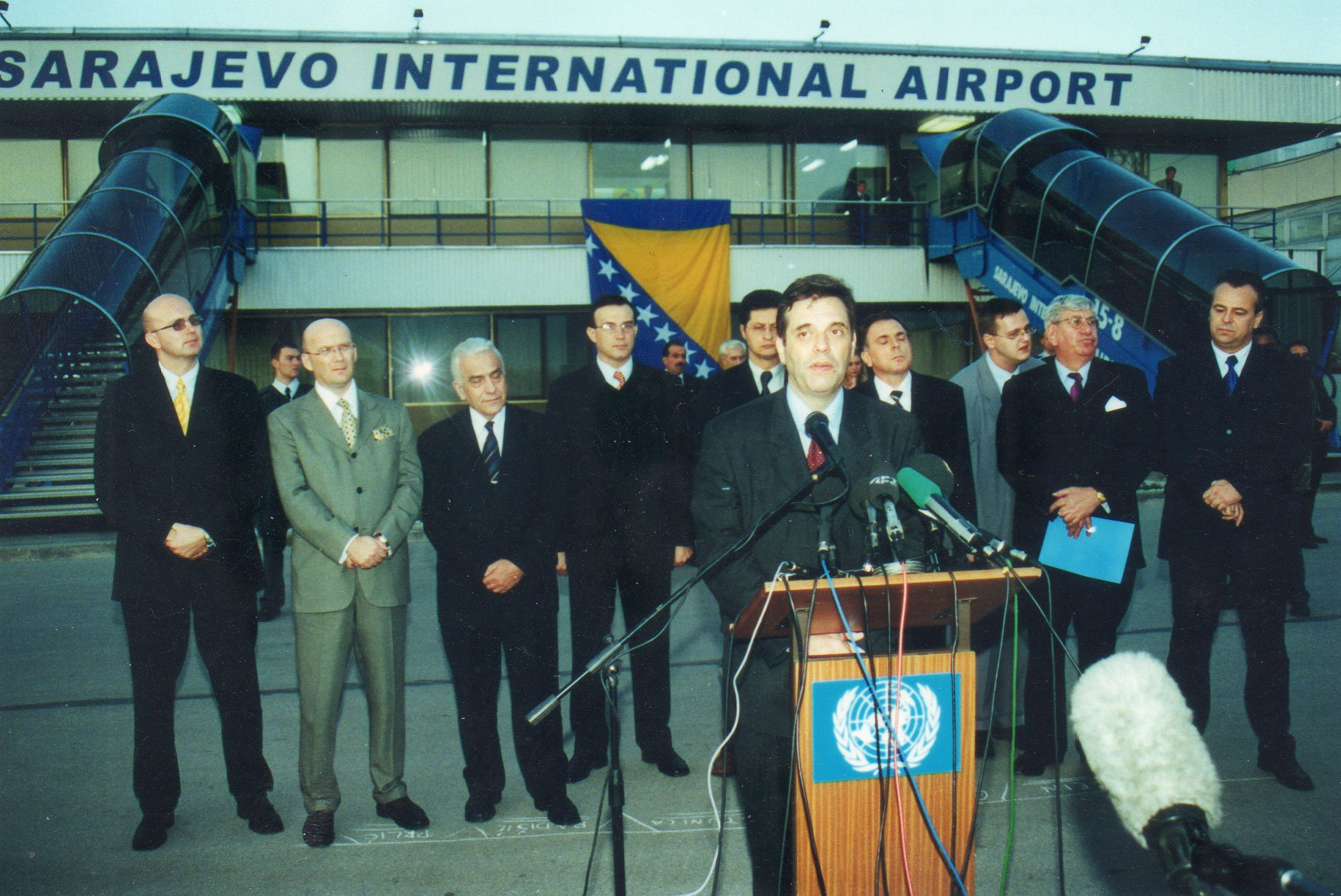
Former President of FR Yugoslavia Vojislav Koštunica with the state leadership of Bosnia and Herzegovina at the Sarajevo International Airport (Jerković, 4th from the left)

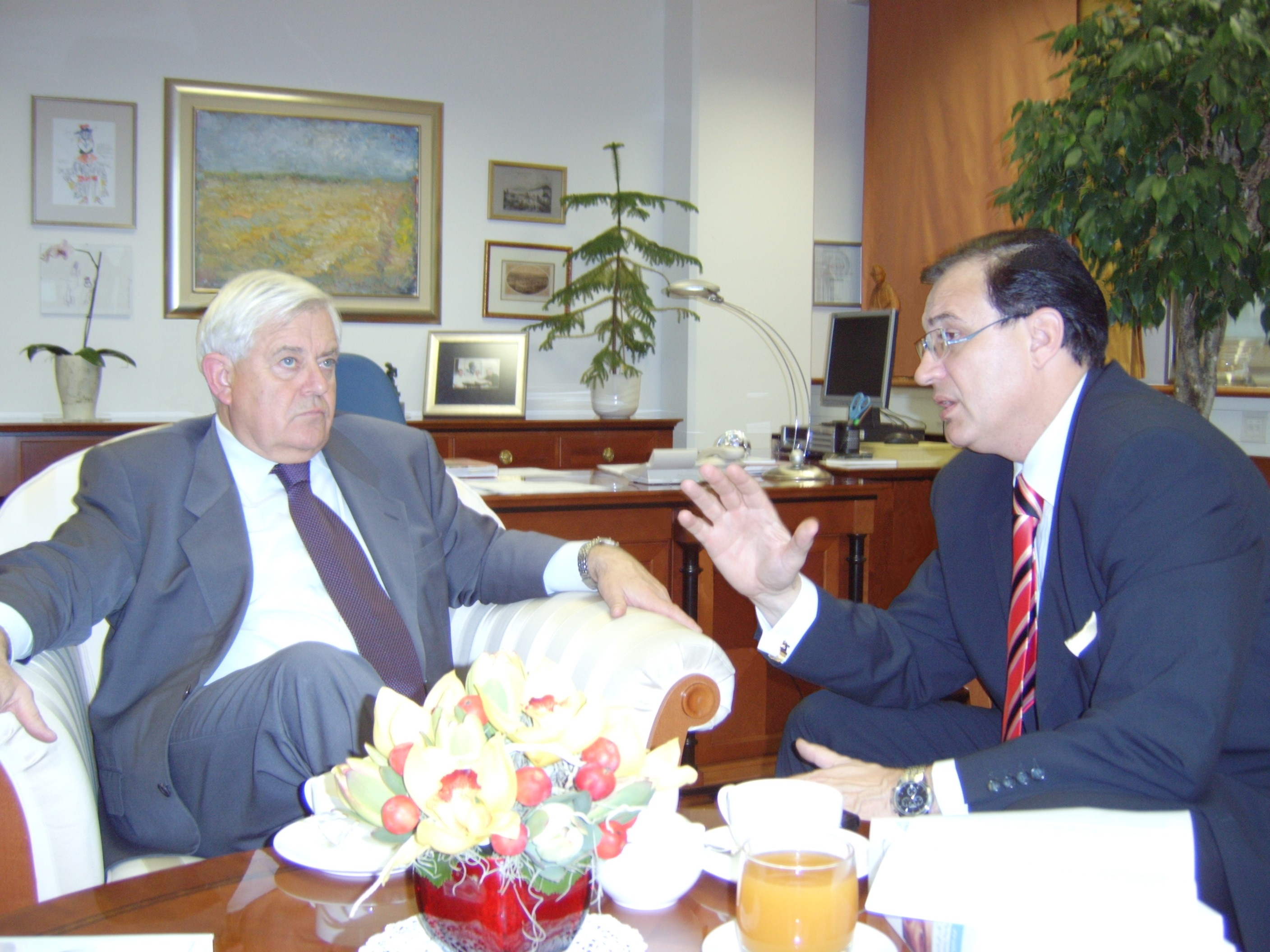
Former President of Slovenia Milan Kučan (left) with Jerković in Ljubljana.

== See also ==
- Alija Izetbegović
- Archives of the Federation of Bosnia and Herzegovina
