= Vijećnica =

Civic building in Sarajevo, Bosnia and Herzegovina

Coordinates: 43°51′33″N 18°26′00″E

Sarajevo City Hall
- Gradska vijećnica Sarajevo / Градска вијећница Сарајево
- Vijećnica in 2026
- Interactive map of Sarajevo City Hall
- Location: Sarajevo
- Designer: Karel Pařík, Alexander Wittek, Ćiril M. Iveković
- Type: City hall
- Beginning date: 1891
- Completion date: 1896
- Opening date: 2014

Sarajevo City Hall (Bosnian, Croatian and Serbian: Gradska vijećnica Sarajevo / Градска вијећница Сарајево), known as Vijećnica (Вијећница), is located in the city of Sarajevo, Bosnia and Herzegovina. It was designed in 1891 by the Czech architect Karel Pařík, but criticisms by the minister, Baron Béni Kállay, caused him to stop working on the project. It was initially the largest and most representative building of the Austro-Hungarian period in Sarajevo and served as the city hall.

The building was reopened on July 17, 2014. It is the current seat and headquarters of the Mayor of Sarajevo, as well as the Sarajevo City Council.

== History ==
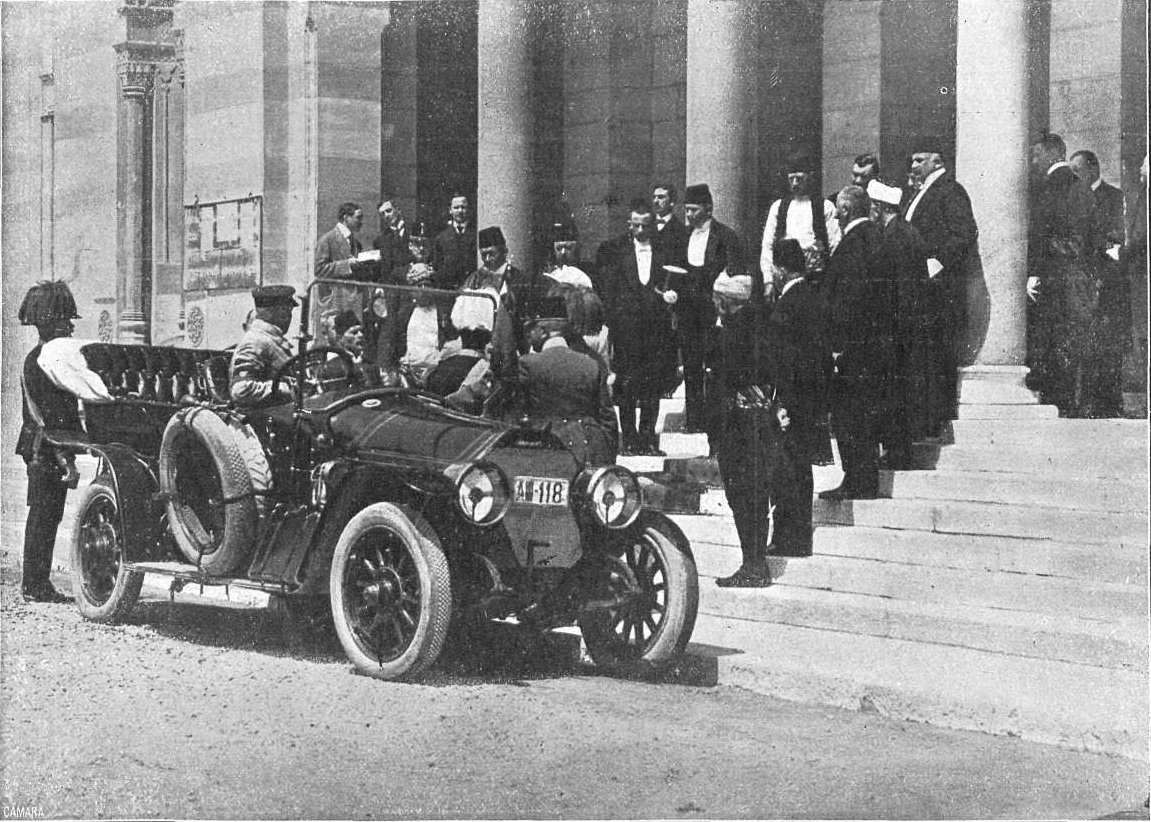
Franz Ferdinand arrives at the city hall between the first and second attempt on his life, 1914

Alexander Wittek, who worked on the project in 1892 and 1893, fell ill and died in 1894 in Graz, and the work was completed by Ćiril Iveković. The edifice was built in a stylistic blend of historical eclecticism, predominantly in the pseudo-Moorish, also known as Moorish Revival, expression, for which the stylistic sources were found in the Islamic art of Spain and North Africa.

Building works began in 1892 and were completed in 1894, at a cost of 984,000 crowns, with 32,000 crowns provided for fixtures and fittings. It was formally opened 20 April 1896, and handed over to the City Authority.

Archduke Franz Ferdinand of Austria and his wife Sophie, Duchess of Hohenberg attended a reception at the town hall on Sunday 28 June 1914. Following the reception they left in a motorcade and were both fatally shot near the Latin Bridge by Gavrilo Princip.

In 1949 it was handed over to the National and University Library of Bosnia and Herzegovina.

On 25 August 1992, Serb shelling during the Siege of Sarajevo caused the complete destruction of the library; among the losses were about 700 manuscripts and incunabula and a unique collection of Bosnian serial publications, some from the middle of the 19th century Bosnian cultural revival. Before the attack, the library held 1.5 million volumes and over 155,000 rare books and manuscripts. Some citizens and librarians tried to save some books while they were under sniper fire, at least one person died. The majority of the books were not saved from the flames.

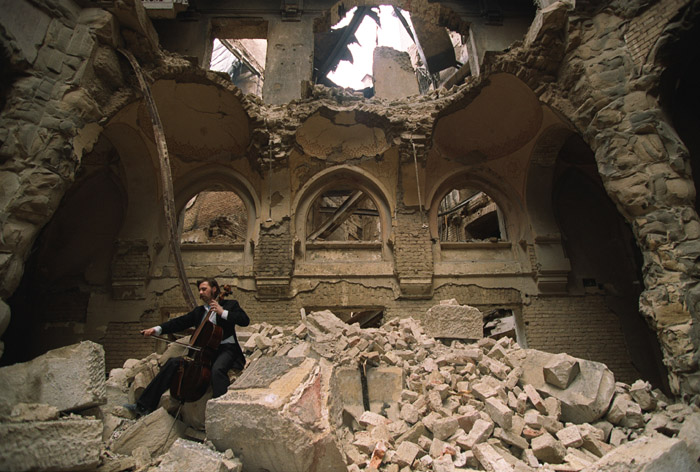
Vedran Smailović playing the cello in the destroyed Vijećnica, 1992

== Renewal ==
The structural repair of the building was planned to be carried out in four stages: 1996 and 1997 (financed by a donation from the Austrian state), and 2000 through 2004 (financed by a donation from the European Commission and the city of Barcelona, among others). The third stage ended in September 2012, with an estimated cost of KM 4.6 million (about €2.37 million) and returned the city hall to its former grace. The fourth stage began following the completion of the third stage and lasted about 20 months, finishing at the end of 2013 and cost of KM 14 million (about €7.23 million) which are secured through the IPA. In this stage the entire interior of the building was rebuilt and reconstructed (paintings, sculptures, books), resulting in the library being brought back to its pre-war condition. Everything that was possible to restore has been done so, while those things that were not possible to save have been made anew through special molds. The whole reconstruction and restoration process was predicted to cost about KM 25 million (about €13 million).

After it was repaired, the building, now a national monument, has been used for variety of events. Its space has been be used for various protocol events for all levels of government, concerts and exhibitions.

=== Delayed opening ===
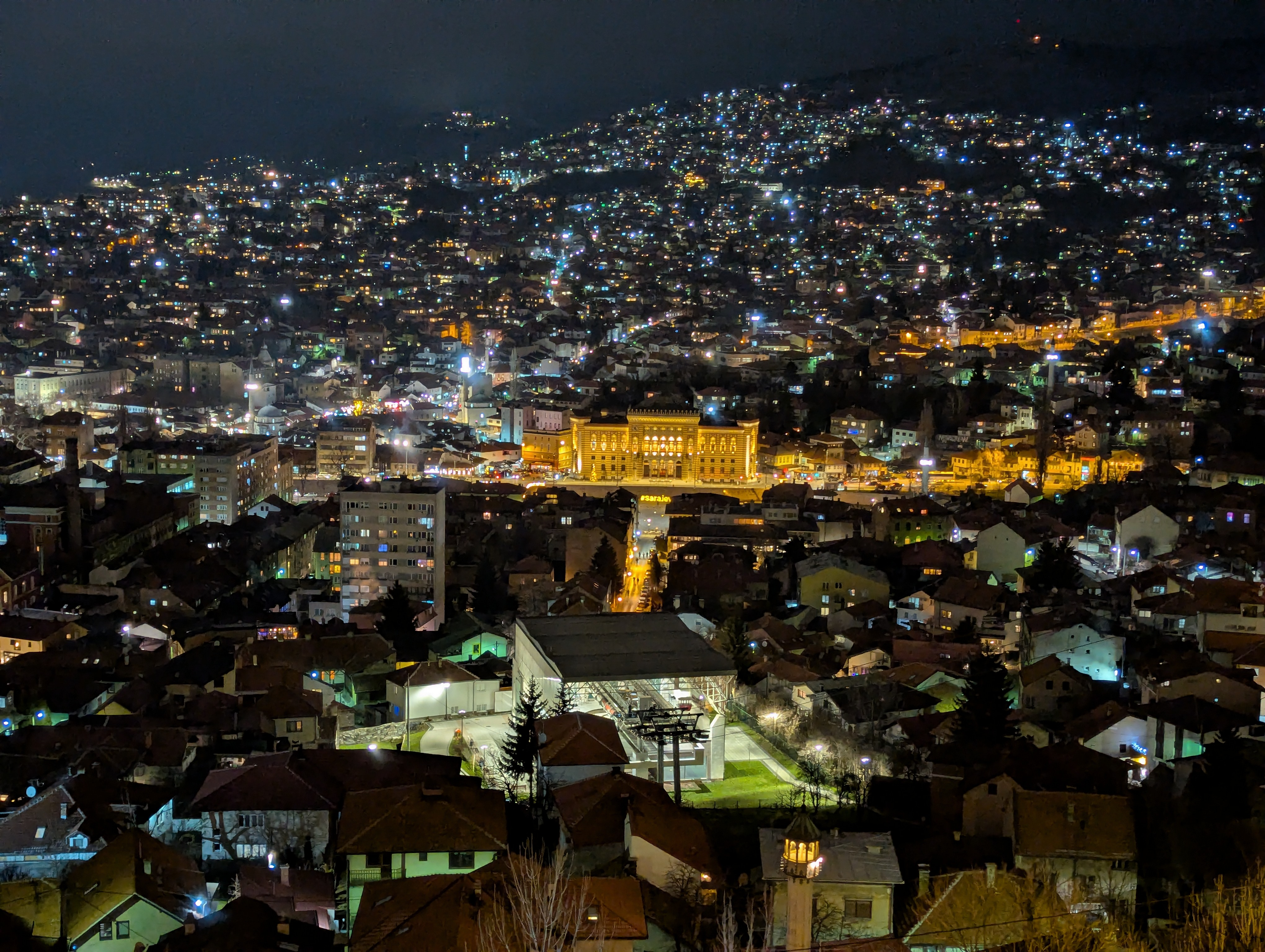
Sarajevo City Hall at night

After years of restoration, the building was intended to initially reopen on 9 May 2014, with the performance of the Sarajevo Philharmonic Orchestra and Vedran Smailović, as well as a 3D projection video mapping by Knap Studio Sarajevo. However, soon after, the opening to the general public was delayed to June 28, 2014 due to further work needed as well as in hopes of commemorating the 100th anniversary of the First World War. After the commemoration, the opening was delayed once again and the building was finally reopen to the general public on July 17, 2014. The delayed opening is believed to be attributed to legal issues as well as the bureaucratization attempt by NUBBiH.

== Legacy ==
In 2022, it was the subject of a stop-motion animated film directed by artist Nicholas F. Callaway, through the research project Imaneo, with funding from Creative Europe.

== Gallery ==
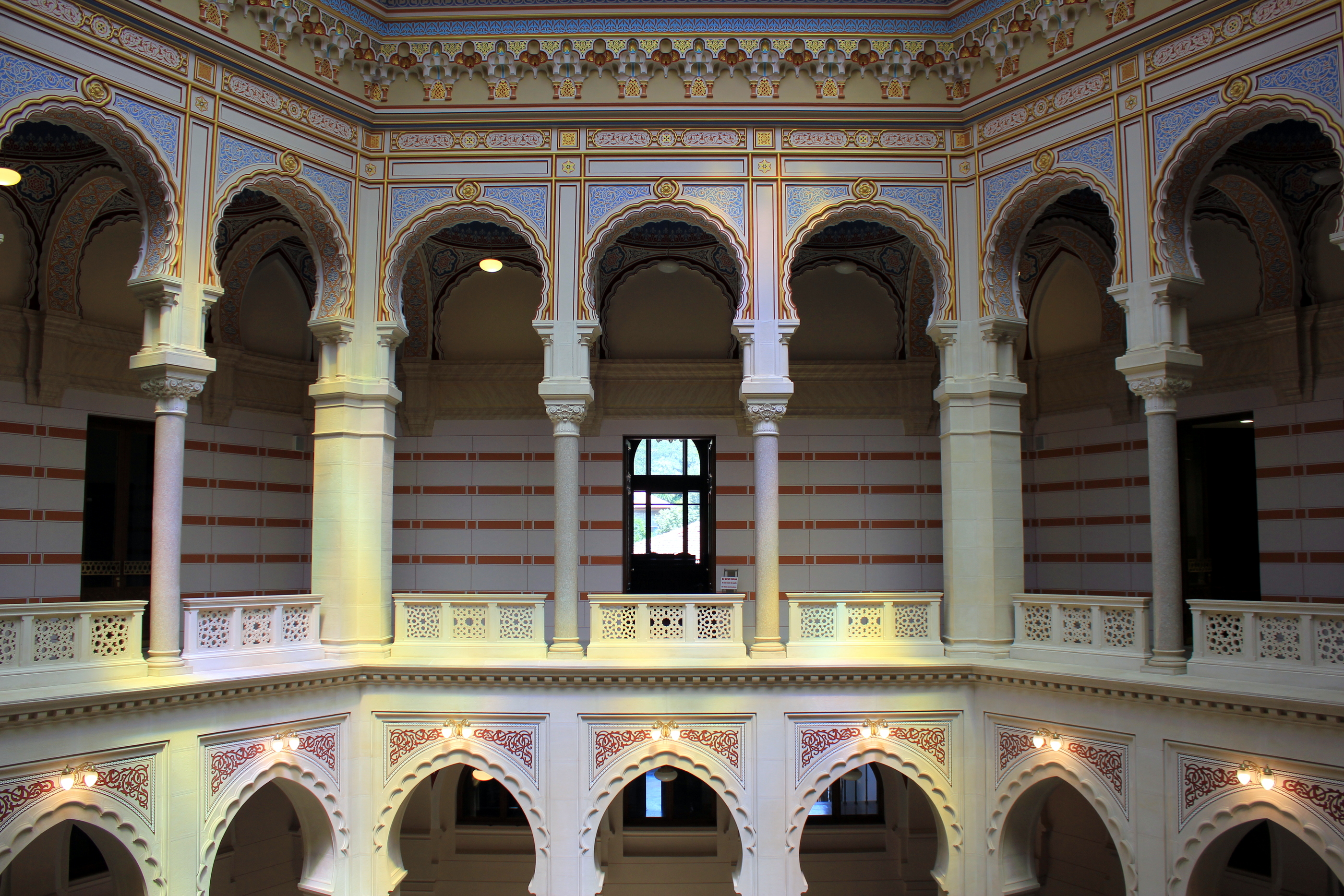
Interior after restoration.

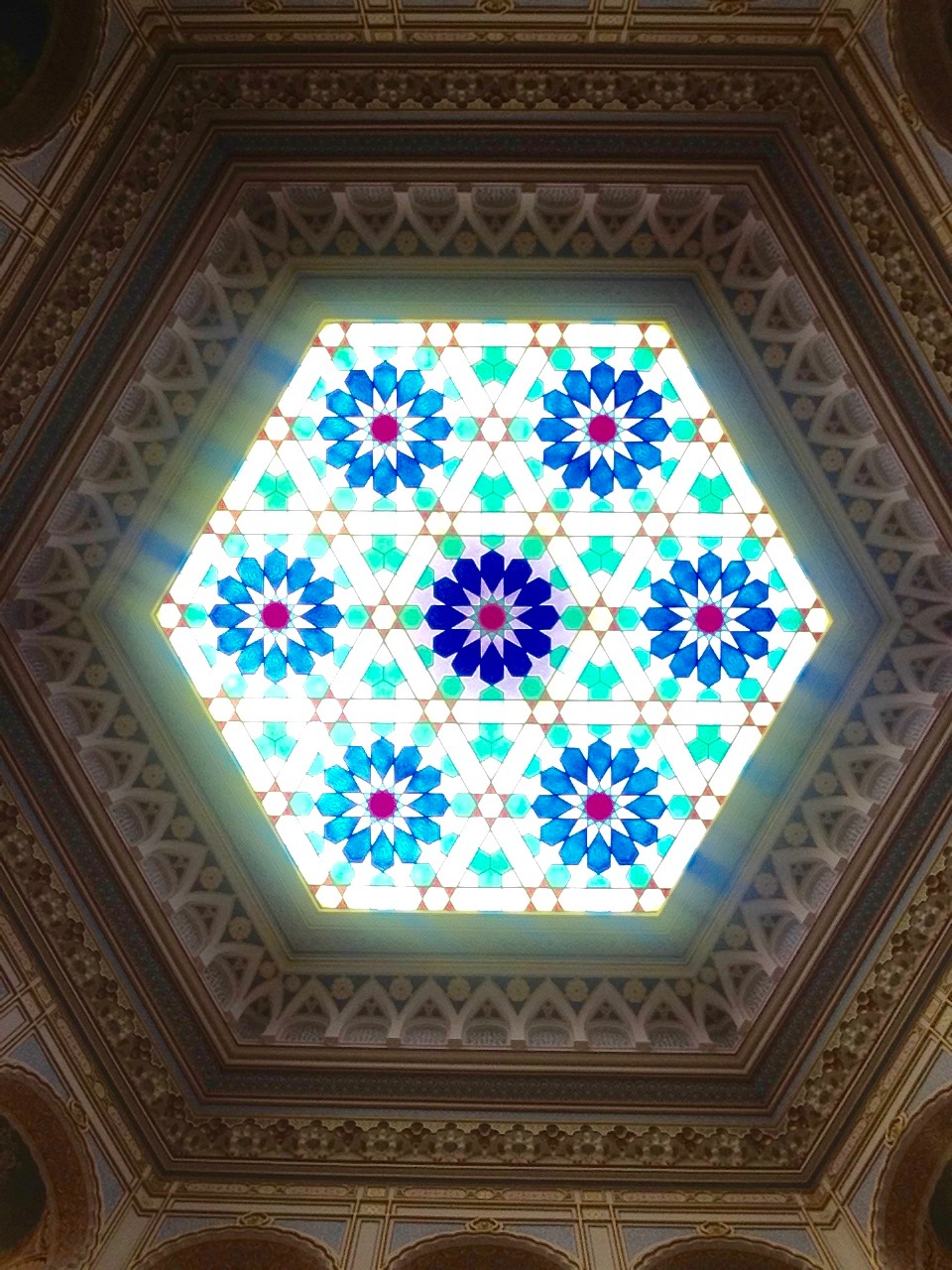
Stained-glass ceiling, interior after restoration.

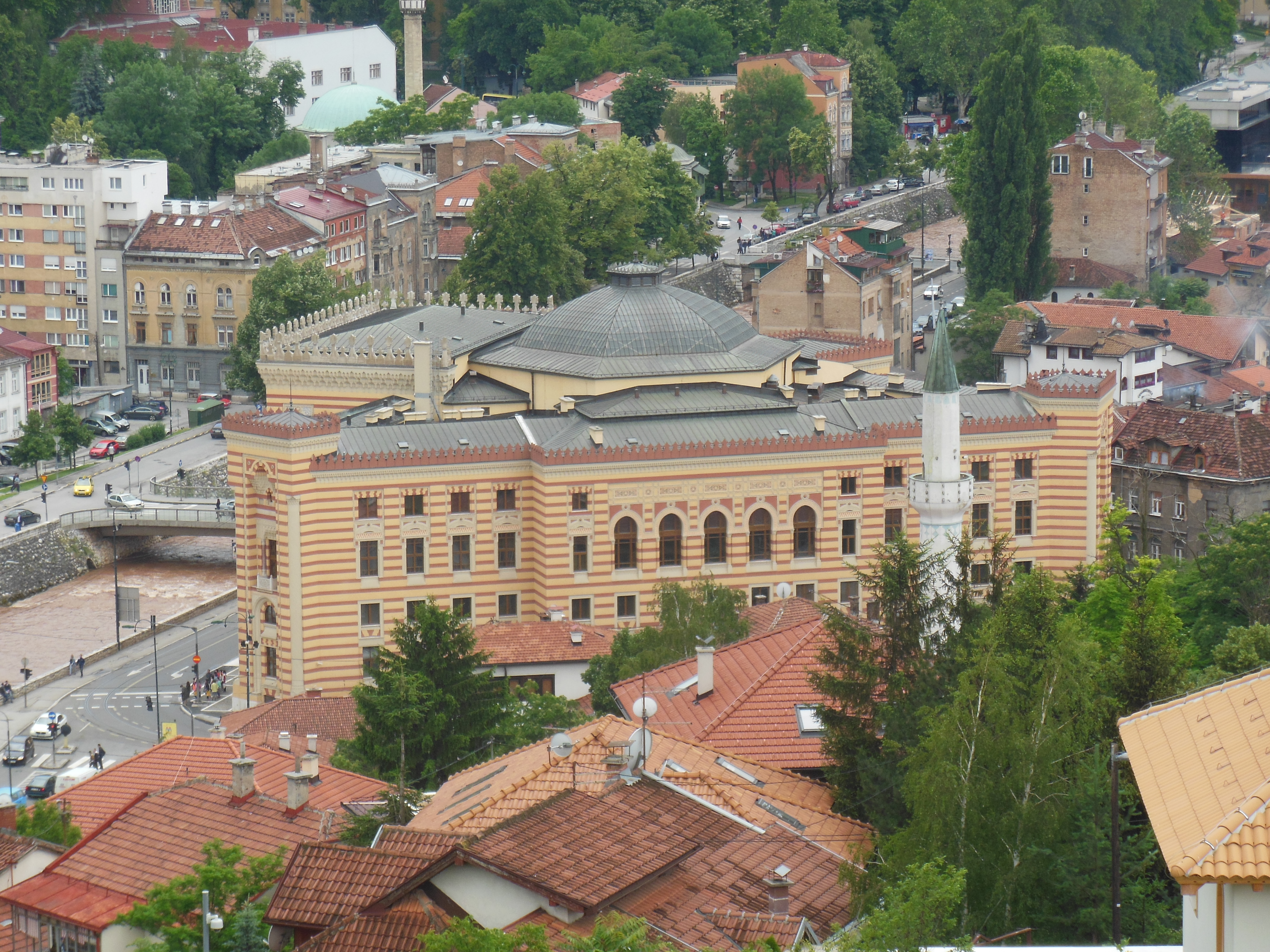
As seen from the Yellow Fortress.

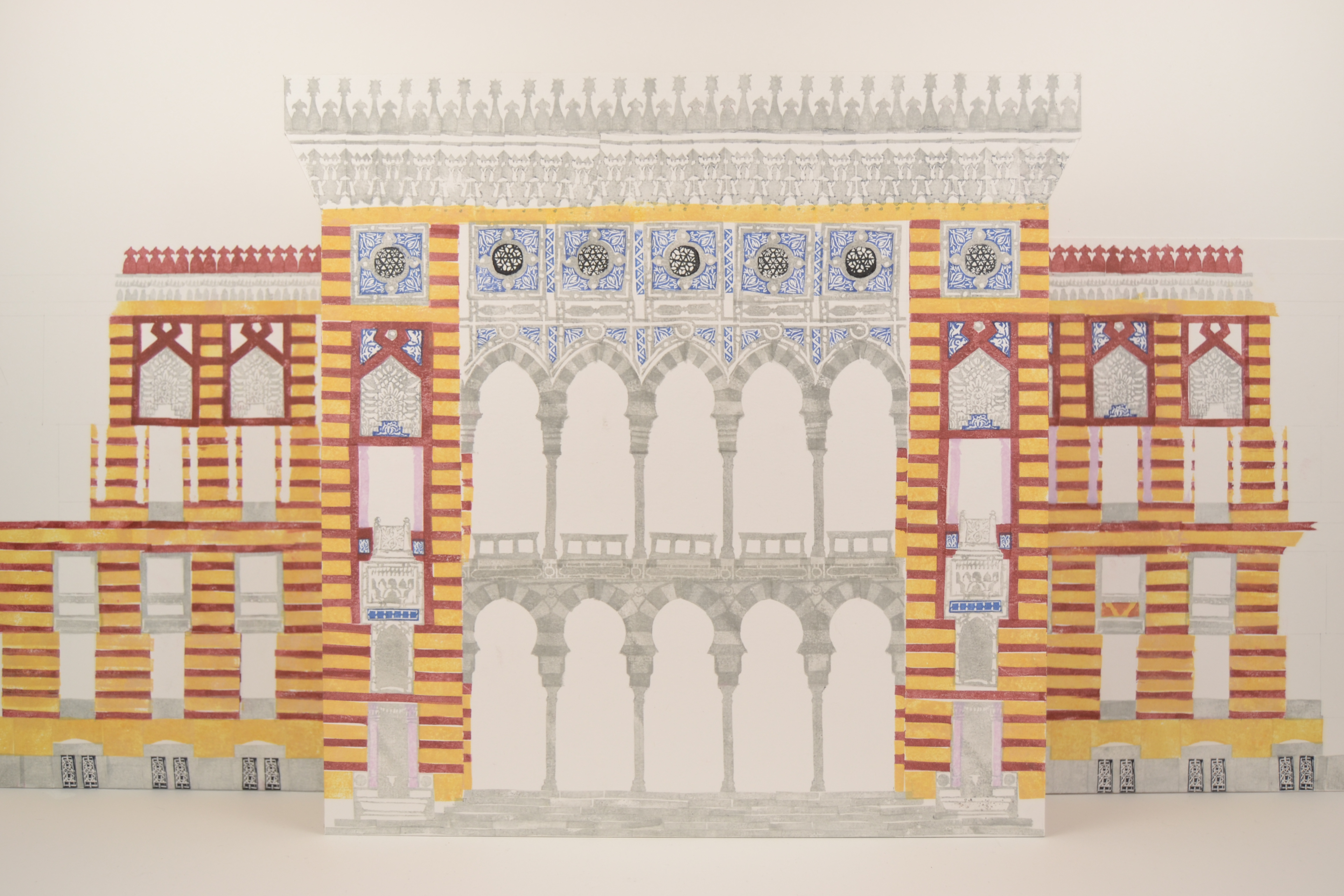
Still from Callaway's film Vijećnica.

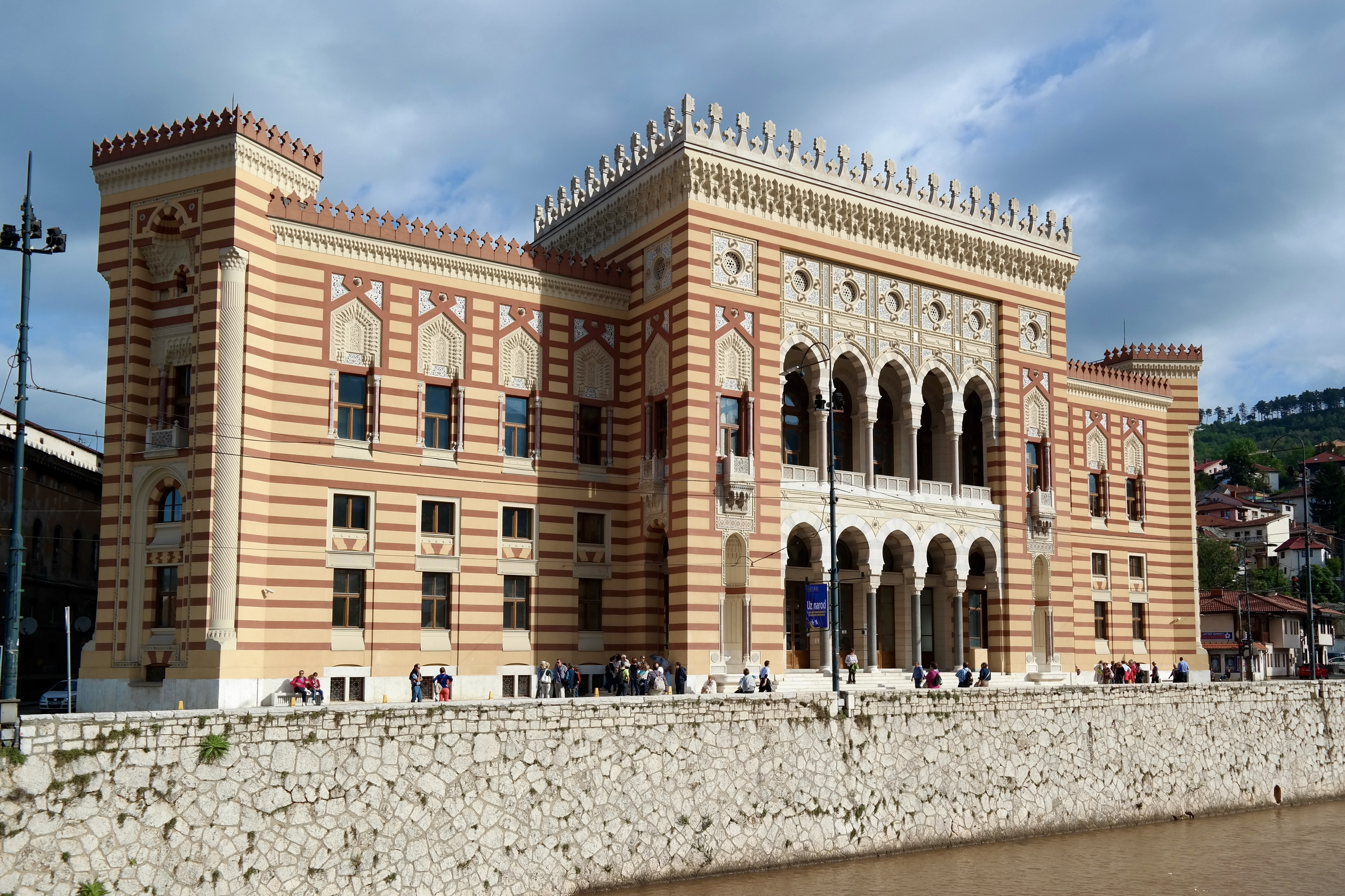
View from the southeast (2014)

== See also ==
- List of National Monuments of Bosnia and Herzegovina
- National and University Library of Bosnia and Herzegovina
- Gimnazija Mostar, also built in Moorish Revival style
- List of destroyed libraries
- List of libraries in Bosnia and Herzegovina
- National Museum of Bosnia and Herzegovina
- Oriental Institute in Sarajevo
