= Hadžem Hajdarević =

Bosnian writer and poet (1956–2023)

- Born: 18 July 1956; Kruševo, SR Bosnia and Herzegovina, SFR Yugoslavia
- Died: 4 December 2023 (aged 67); Sarajevo, Bosnia and Herzegovina
- Occupations: writer, poet

Hadžem Hajdarević (18 July 1956 – 4 December 2023) was a Bosnian writer and poet.

== Biography ==
Hadžem Hajdarević was born in Kruševo, near Foča, on 18 July 1956. He was educated in Gazi-Husrefbeg's religious high school and the Faculty of Philosophy in Sarajevo.

Hajdarević died in Sarajevo on 4 December 2023, at the age of 67.

== Bibliography ==
=== Poetry ===
- "Seoba obala", Svjetlost, Sarajevo, 1981.
- "Koje Nuhove lađe", Veselin Masleša, Sarajevo, 1987.
- "Žive vode", Veselin Masleša, Sarajevo, 1990.
- "Pjesme ponornice", IPC i udruženi Izdavači, Sarajevo, 1995.
- "Četvera ušća", selected songs, Ljiljan, Sarajevo, 1995.
- "Peto ušće", Bosanska knjiga, Sarajevo, 1997.
- "Nausikajina kći", selected songs about love, Damad, Novi Pazar, 1999.
- "Sutrašnje putovanje brodom", Ljiljan & Bemust, Sarajevo, 2000.
- "Ušća", Sto knjiga bošnjačke književnosti, VI KOLO (sa S. Mehmedinovićem), BZK Preporod, Sarajevo, 2003.
- "Na sonetnim otocima", Vrijeme, 2004.
- "Gdje voda izvire", Dobra knjiga, 2010.
- "Sutjeska", VBZ, 2012.

=== Prose ===
- "Priče sa Dobrinje", anecdotal prose, Bemust, Sarajevo, 1999.
- "Klinika za plastičnu hirurgiju", stories, Ljiljan, Sarajevo, 2000.
- "Kišno društvo", Tugra, Sarajevo, 2006.
- Rječnik bosanskog jezika, Institut za jezik, 2007.
- "Život u akvariju", Dobra knjiga, 2011.
- "Pravopisni priručnik bosanskog/hrvatskog/srpskog jezika sa osnovama gramatike", BH Most, 2013
- "Gdje si ti ovih godina", Dobra knjiga, 2015.
- "Arabeske od vode", 2023.

== Awards ==
- Trebinje Poetry Evenings Award 1982.
- Nagrada Svjetlosti 1982.
- Skender Kulenović Award 1996.
- Planjax award for his book of poetry «Na sonetnim otocima» 2004.
