= Archives of the Federation of Bosnia and Herzegovina =

Coordinates: 43.8562°N 18.3828°E

Archives of Federation of Bosnia and Herzegovina
- Arhiv Federacije Bosne i Hercegovine
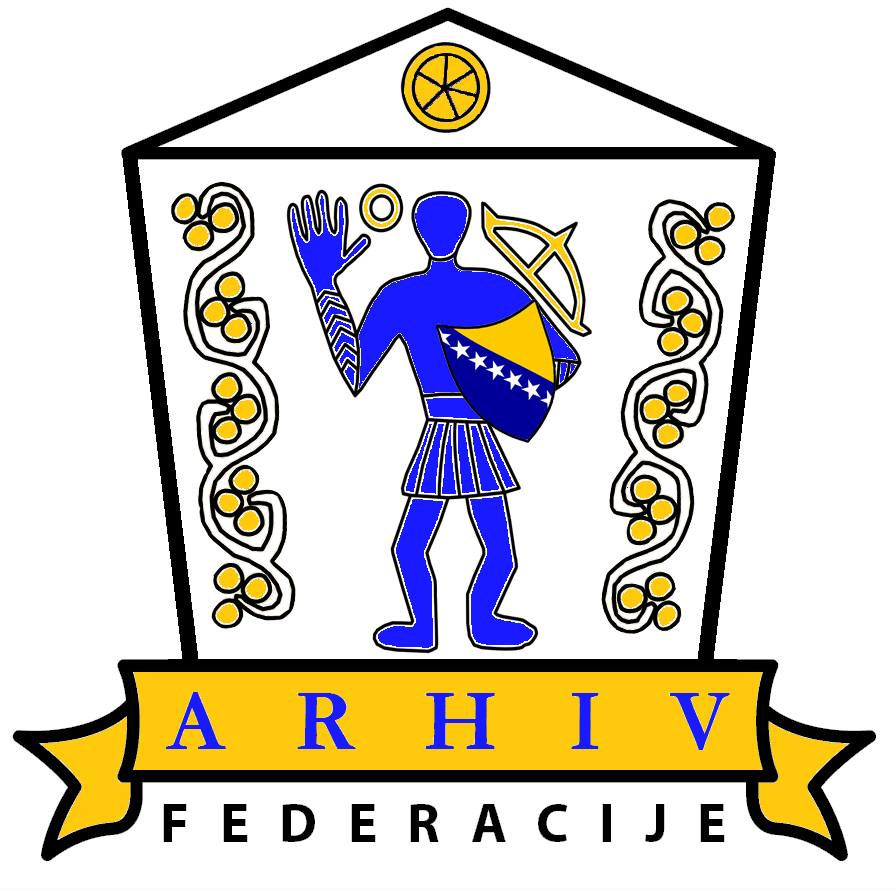

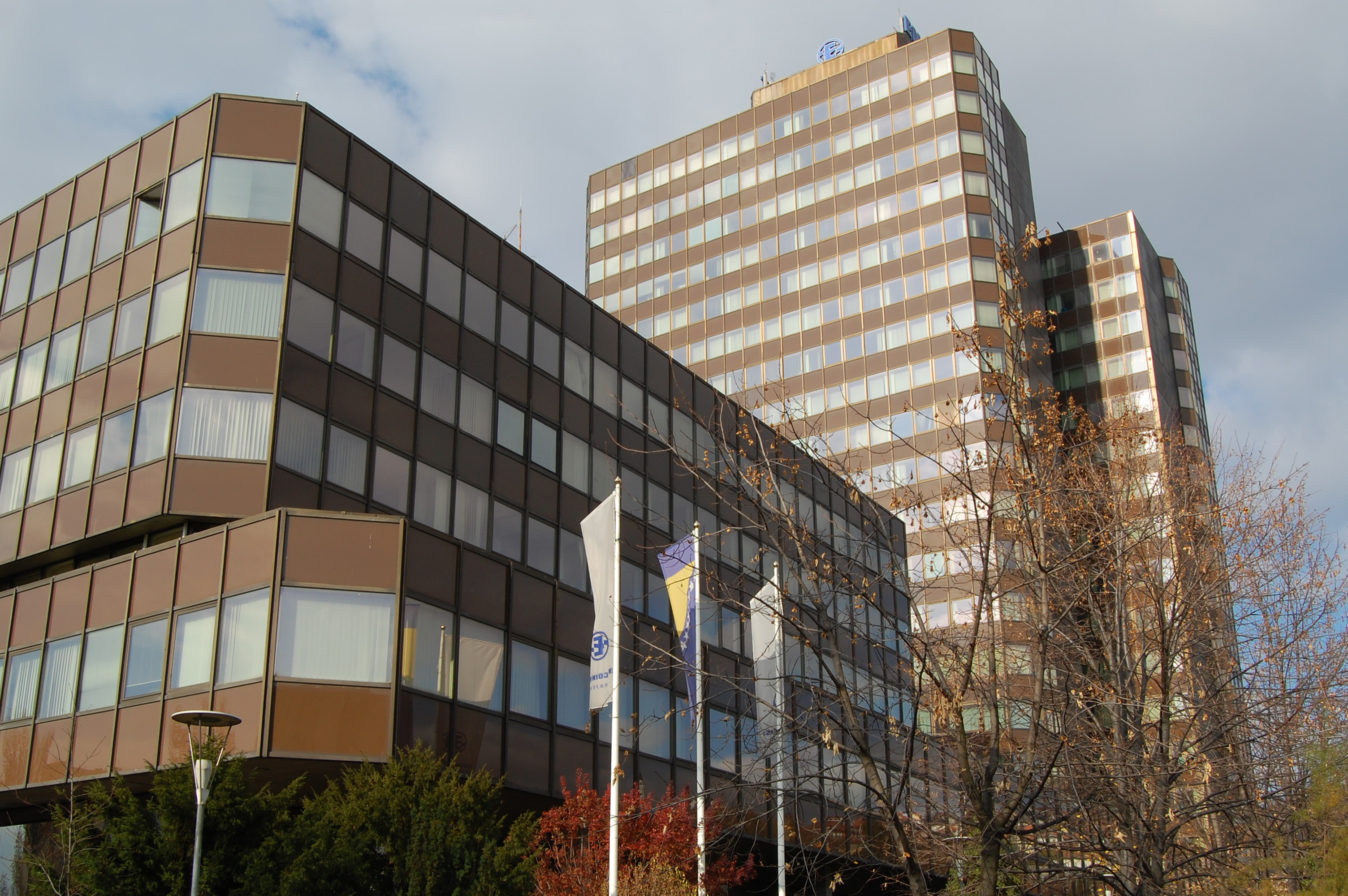
- Building of the Energoinvest Company, housing the Archives of Federation of Bosnia and Herzegovina and other federal government offices

National archives overview
- Formed: June 1, 1997
- Jurisdiction: Federation of Bosnia and Herzegovina
- Headquarters: Sarajevo
- National archives executive: Dr. Adamir Jerković, Director
- Website: www.arhivfbih.gov.ba

The Archives of the Federation of Bosnia and Herzegovina (abr. AFBIH) is an institution that collects, preserves, protects and ensures professional treatment of archival material for the purpose of its use primarily in the territory of the Federation of Bosnia and Herzegovina, but its archival fonds also feature archival material from Bosnia and Herzegovina.

== Establishment ==
The initiative for the establishment of the Archives of the Federation of Bosnia and Herzegovina was launched in 1994, at the time of transformation of Bosnia and Herzegovina and during which the Federation of Bosnia and Herzegovina was established. The Archives became operative on 1 June 1997, as an administrative organization that preserves and protects the archival and current records created as part of the activities of the Parliament of the Federation of Bosnia and Herzegovina, the President and vice-president of the Federation of Bosnia and Herzegovina. It governs, federal and administrative institutions of the Federation of Bosnia and Herzegovina, as well as other agencies such as citizens' associations and other legal entities that have been organized at the entity level since 1994 when the Federation of Bosnia and Herzegovina was founded. The Archive is an independent federal institution whose current status is regulated under the Law on the Federal Ministries and Other Organs of the Federal Administration.

Since 2016, the Archives of the Federation of Bosnia and Herzegovina use the new emblem which has been inspired by a stylized “stećak” tombstone.

== Main Role and Tasks of the Archives of the Federation of Bosnia and Herzegovina ==
The Archives of the Federation of Bosnia and Herzegovina is in charge of drafting methodological instructions, establishing standards and norms for archival activities, developing archival activities, issuing certificates and other official documents dealing with the facts and evidence which can be found in the archival material it keeps; The Archives of the Federation of Bosnia and Herzegovina also provides professional training for the employees of the archival departments, conducts scientific research and publishing activities in the field of archival work and facilitates international cooperation between the archives.

After taking over the archival material, the Archives then sort and process the material, provides scientific and informational resources, publishes the mentioned archival material, makes material available for use, organizes exhibitions of archive material etc.

== Organizational structure ==
Archives of Federation of Bosnia and Herzegovina is composed of three main sectors.

- Sector for legal and financial affairs and preservation of archival material outside Archives
- Sector for archiving, preservation and processing of archival material within Archives
- Sector for INDOC, service of scientific research, publishing, cultural and educational affairs
  - Department for digitization of Archive and archival material

== Activities of Archives of the FBiH ==
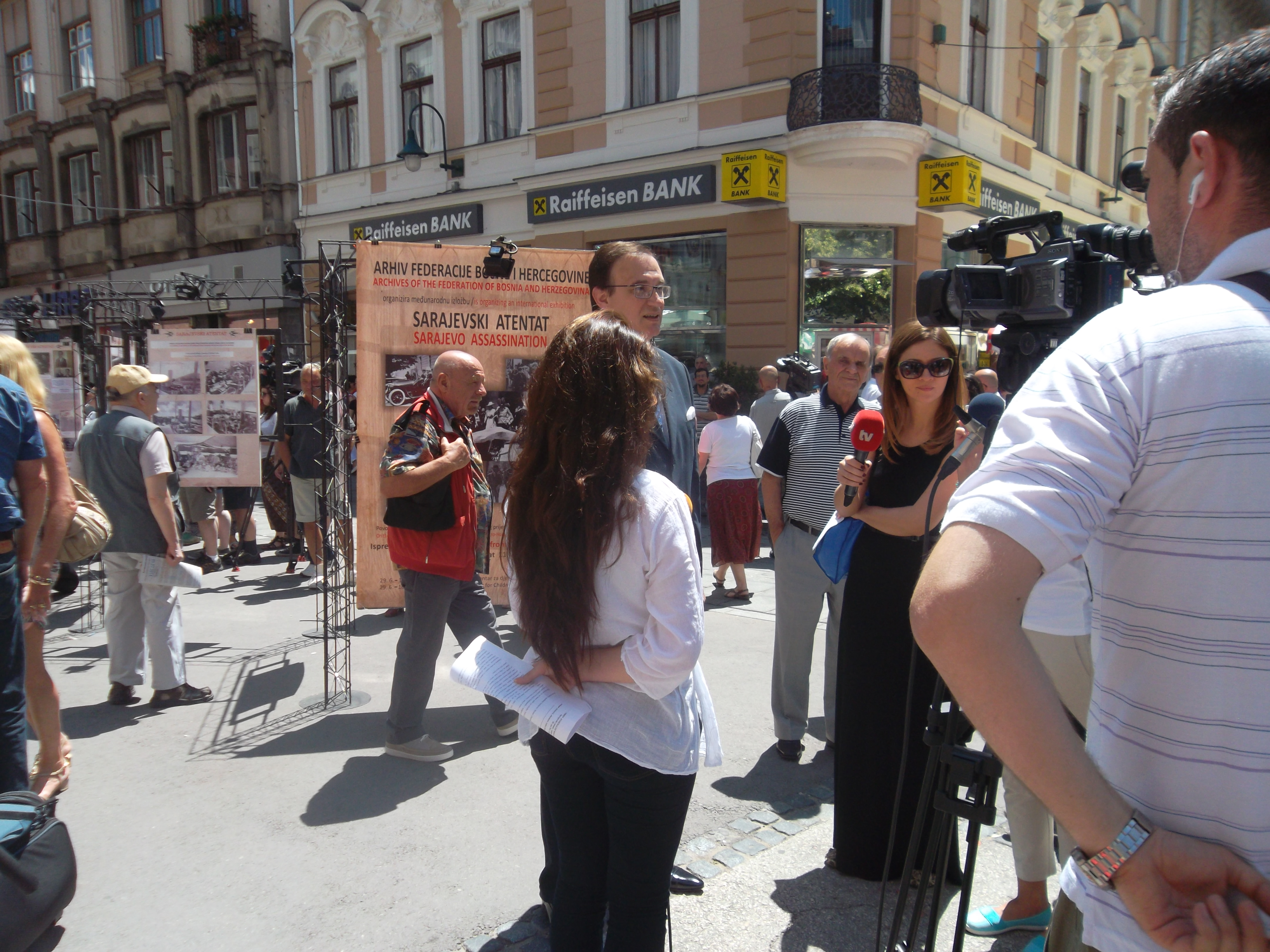
Exhibition of the Gallery "Sarajevo Assassination" hosted by Archive of Federation of Bosnia and Herzegovina in the Sarajevo.

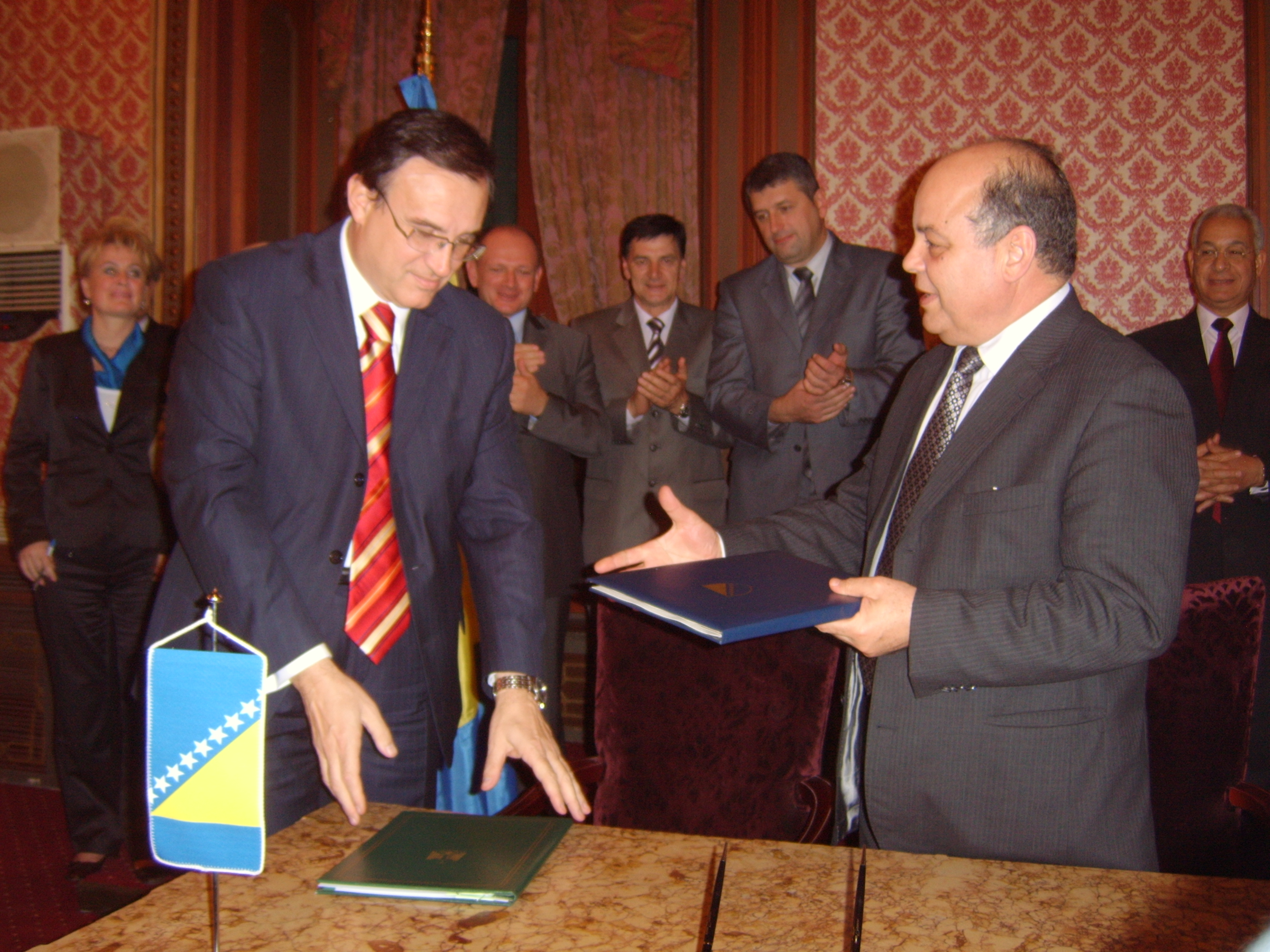
Signing of the Memorandum of Cooperation between the Archives of the Federation of Bosnia and Herzegovina and the Egyptian national archives in Cairo, 17 11.2009.

As of January 2017, Archive of Federation of Bosnia and Herzegovina holds 34 fonds. The most notable archival fond is the one related to Branko Mikulić and which is being studied by a large number of users from all around the world. The Library of the Archives contains over 2500 books and other publications which are classified as following:

- Books - primarily in the fields of general and national history, auxiliary historical science, laws, politics, public administration, geography, literature etc.
- Periodical Titles - such as Official Gazettes, Magazines in the fields of culture, art, education, periodical publications in the field of history etc.
- Dictionaries and manuals, lexicons, bulletins, exhibition catalogs etc.

Since 2010, the Archives organize exhibitions mostly dealing with the genocide in Srebrenica. Global exhibition on this subject entitled "Srebrenica Inferno" was organized in more than 35 global capitals and cities in Europe, Asia and Africa.

On the 100th anniversary of the murder of Archduke Franz Ferdinand of Austria, Archive of the Federation organized on June 28, 2014, an exhibition titled "Sarajevo Assassination". The exhibit was placed in front of the Sacred Heart Cathedral, Sarajevo, in the open, and seen by 30,000 people. This international exhibition was also organized in several capital cities around Europe.

In 2015, two exhibitions on World Wars were presented to the public; an exhibition titled "The Great War (1914-1918)" which contained 35 billboards with images and information on World War I and was organized in Sarajevo and other cities; and on the occasion of the 70th anniversary of victory over fascism, Archives organized exhibition "Bosnia and Herzegovina in World War II"

Also in 2015, another notable exhibition was organized titled "Bosnia at the time of Ban Kulin" and has been seen by many citizens of Bosnia and Herzegovina.

In the same year, Archives introduced integral Bosnian-Herzegovinian awards which are presented to the best archivists and individuals or institutions for their contribution to the memorialization of the Bosnian-Herzegovinian history, as well as affirmation of Bosnia and Herzegovina in the country and abroad. These awards are: King Tvrtko I Kotromanić, Bosnian Stećak Tombstone and Recognition of the Archives of the Federation of BiH in the form of a plaque.

== Cooperation of Archives of the FBiH ==
The Archives of the Federation of Bosnia and Herzegovina cooperates with the Association of Archival and Administrative Workers of the Federation of Bosnia and Herzegovina, which was established in 2009 at the Archives' initiation. The Archives also established institutional cooperation with archival institutions in other countries through memoranda of cooperation. In 2007, Dr. Adamir Jerković was appointed its director of the Archives.

== Seat of the Archives of the Federation of Bosnia and Herzegovina ==
The Archives of the Federation does not have its own building and it has been a tenant since it has been established in 1997. Initially, it was located in the building of the Presidency of Bosnia and Herzegovina, but after the protests in February 2014 during which the administrative premises were set on fire, it has changed its address and now it is located at Marka Marulića 2, Sarajevo, together with its depot.
