= Kruševo, Foča =

Kruševo
- Village
- Location within Bosnia and Herzegovina
- Coordinates: 43°23′20″N 18°41′14″E
- Country: Bosnia and Herzegovina
- Entity: Republika Srpska
- Municipality: Foča
- Time zone: UTC+1 (CET)
  - Summer (DST): UTC+2 (CEST)

Kruševo (Крушево) is a village in the municipality of Foča, Bosnia and Herzegovina.
