= Association of Writers of Bosnia and Herzegovina =

The Association of Writers of Bosnia and Herzegovina (Bosnian: Društvo pisaca Bosne i Hercegovine, Друштво писаца Босне и Херцеговине) is a professional organisation of poets, essayists, novelists, and other writers in Bosnia and Herzegovina.

The Društvo pisaca Bosne i Hercegovine, founded in 1993 by Zlatko Topčić, is the legal successor of the Udruženje književnika Bosne i Hercegovine, which was founded on 8 September 1945 by Marko Marković, Isak Samokovlija, Skender Kulenović and Emil Petrović. Branches were formed in Sarajevo, Banja Luka, Tuzla, Zenica and Mostar.

== History ==
=== Socialist Republic of Bosnia and Herzegovina ===
Following the end of the World War II in Yugoslavia the association of writers in newly established Yugoslav federal unit of People's Republic of Bosnia and Herzegovina started their coordinated activities in October 1945. On the 17–20 November 1946 Belgrade Congress of the Association of Writers of Yugoslavia advisory instructions on literary organizations in Yugoslavia were introduced influencing further development of the organisation in Bosnia and Herzegovina. The formal founding assembly of the Association of Writers of Bosnia and Herzegovina was held on 20 February 1947 which selected Isak Samokovlija as its first president and Emil S. Petrović as a secretary. In the initial period members were visiting factories, companies, institutions and youth work actions where they presented their literary work and collected material for further writing.

1951 annual assembly elected Marko Marković as the new president who remained in this position until 1954 election of Dušan Đurović. From 1952 the Association started publishing the literary and cultural journal Život which served as the official gazette of the Association between 1961 and 1963. In January 1957 the second journal focused on literary and art critique was initiated under the title of Izraz. Meša Selimović was elected as the president of the Association in 1962, the same year in which "Sarajevo Poetry Days" were initiated.

From early 1960s Association established its own book edition titled Biblioteka danas.

== Membership and presidency ==
In 2015, the association had 190 regular members and 16 honorary members.

The current president of the association is Hadžem Hajdarević, elected on 1 April 2018. The other members of the presidency are Jagoda Iličić, Damir Uzunović, Miro Petrović, Aleksandra Čvorović and Goran Karanović.

== See also ==
- Association of Writers of Yugoslavia
- Association of Writers of Republika Srpska
