= Oriental Institute in Sarajevo =

Academic unit of the University of Sarajevo

- Orijentalni institut u Sarajevu
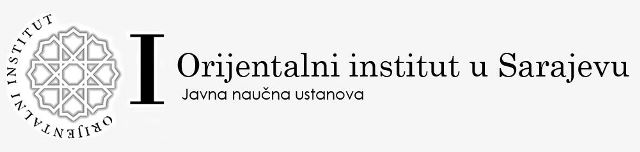
- Formation: 15 May 1950
- Registration no.: 4200543100009
- Coordinates: 43.856029°N 18.397563°E
- Official language: Bosnian
- Parent organization: University of Sarajevo
- Staff: 19 (2015)
- Website: www.ois.unsa.ba

The Oriental Institute in Sarajevo (Bosnian: Orijentalni institut u Sarajevu / Оријентални институт у Сарајеву) is an academic institute in Sarajevo, Bosnia and Herzegovina. It was founded in 1950 by the Socialist Republic of Bosnia and Herzegovina and is part of the University of Sarajevo. but it suffered significant destruction in 1992 during the Siege of Sarajevo.

== 1992 shelling ==
Its premises, research library and complete manuscript collection (more than 2,000 codices and 15,000 other archival material) were deliberately destroyed in shelling on May 18, 1992 by Army of Republika Srpska forces around the besieged city of Sarajevo. According to interviews with eyewitnesses, the building had been hit with a barrage of incendiary munitions, fired from positions on the hills overlooking the town center. No other buildings in the densely built neighborhood were hit. The Institute, which occupied the top floors of a large, four-storey office block on the corner of Veljka Cubrilovica Street and Marshal Tito Boulevard (Sarajevo Centar municipality), was completely burned out, its collections destroyed.

The manuscript collection of the Oriental institute was one of the richest collections of Oriental manuscripts worldwide. These manuscripts over centuries were written in the wide areas of the East to serve worldwide as life manuals for the people.

Losses also included 5,263 bound manuscripts in Arabic, Persian, Turkish, Hebrew and local arebica - (Bosnian in Arabic script), as well as tens of thousands of Ottoman-era documents. Only about 1% of Institute materials was saved.

== See also ==
- Destruction of libraries
- Book burning
- Vijećnica
