= National and University Library of Bosnia and Herzegovina =

National library of Bosnia and Herzegovina

- Nacionalna i univerzitetska biblioteka Bosne i Hercegovine; Национална и универзитетска библиотека Босне и Херцеговине
- 43°51′21.5″N 18°23′50″E
- Location: Sarajevo, Bosnia and Herzegovina
- Established: 31 October 1945
- Reference to legal mandate: Regulation on the National Library of the Peoples Republic of Bosnia and Herzegovina

Other information
- Director: Adisa Žero
- Website: www.nub.ba

The National and University Library of Bosnia and Herzegovina (Bosnian, Croatian and Serbian: Nacionalna i univerzitetska biblioteka Bosne i Hercegovine / Национална и универзитетска библиотека Босне и Херцеговине, NUBBiH) is the national library of Bosnia and Herzegovina based in Sarajevo. During the Bosnian War, during the siege of Sarajevo, in the night from 25th to 26th August 1992, members of the Army of the Republika Srpska (VRS) shelled Vijećnica, Sarajevo's City Hall, where the library was located at that time. As a result, many of its archival and library holdings were destroyed, along with the flame on top of it being put out. Current location of NUBBiH is in the Campus of the University of Sarajevo.

== History ==
The National and University Library of Bosnia and Herzegovina was established by the Regulation on the National Library of the Yugoslav republic, Bosnia and Herzegovina, signed by the then Minister of Education Ante Babić, which was published in the Official Gazette of the People's Republic of Bosnia and Herzegovina, on 31 October 1945.

The introductory part of the document reads: "On the basis of the authority of the National Government of Bosnia and Herzegovina on 9 October 1945. The Ministry of Education stipulates the following Decree on the National Library of the Peoples Republic of Bosnia and Herzegovina."

In the first article of this legal act of stands: "It shall be established in Sarajevo National library of Bosnia and Herzegovina. It comes under the supervision of the Ministry of Education. The National library is the central library for the Federal republic, Bosnia and Herzegovina, its activity covers the whole territory of Bosnia and Herzegovina."

The mission for which this institution was founded as highlighted in Article 2 of the said Regulation:

"The National Library in Sarajevo has the task: to its readers and provide comprehensive knowledge of the life and culture of our peoples, especially the peoples of Bosnia and Herzegovina, to enable individuals and institutions and work in the field of science and art; to promote the establishment and improvement of library in Bosnia and Herzegovina, and by agreement with the Ministry of Education of the Peoples Republic of Bosnia and Herzegovina."

Thanks to its successful development, this institution has received a university function, which proved to be justified, because today the majority of its users are scholars, professors, and students of Bosnian-Herzegovinian universities.

The archives of historian Hamdija Kapidžić are in the library's special collections.

In October 1995, in the Official Journal of the Republic of BiH, no. 37/95, the Law on Libraries was published, on the basis of which the NUB BiH operates.

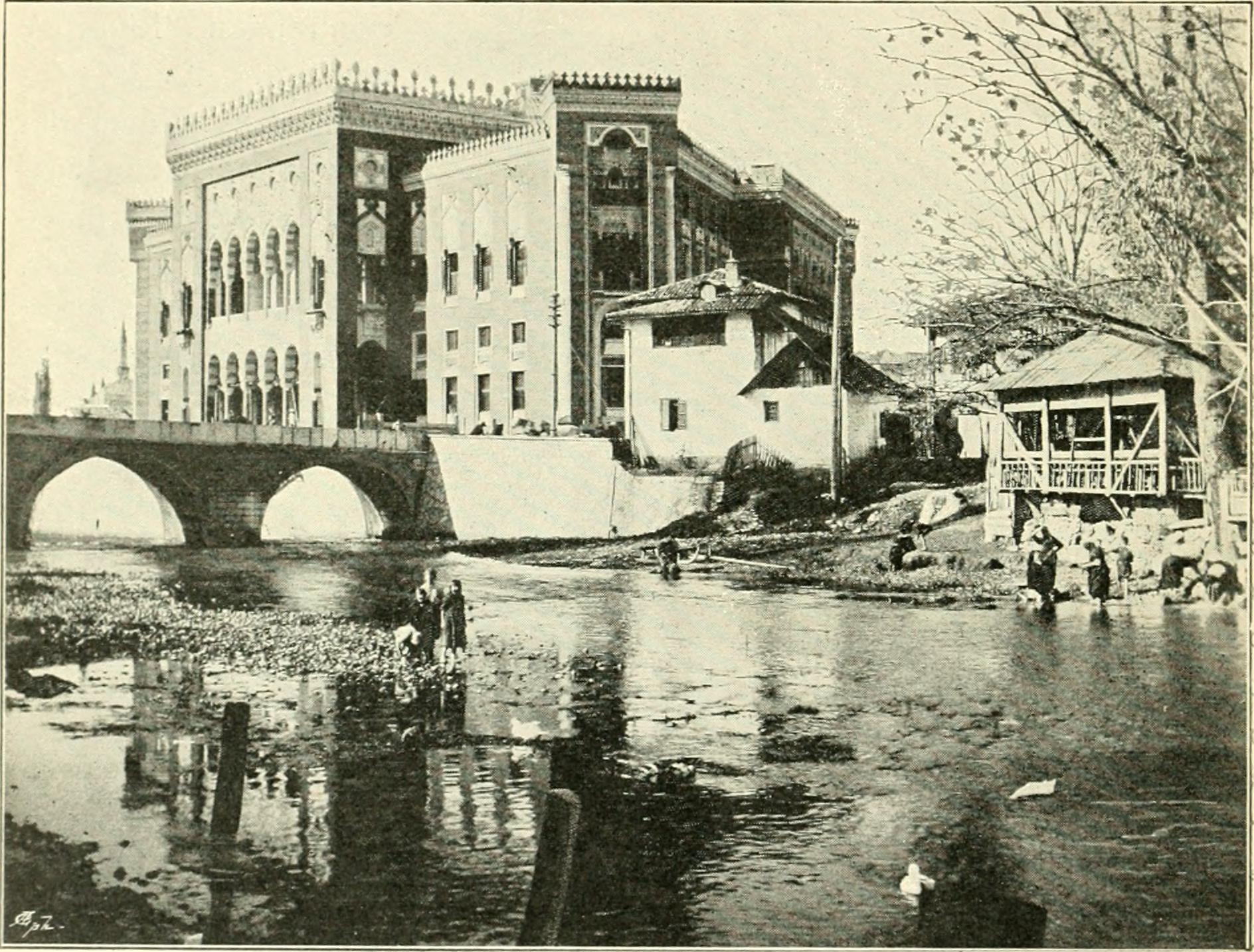
Vijecnica in 1897.

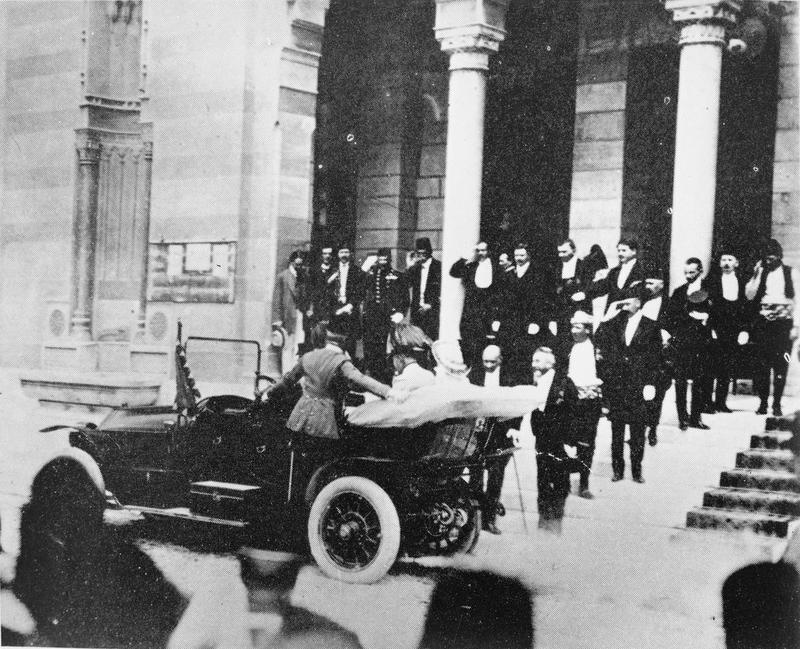
Archduke Franz Ferdinand and his wife, Sophie, departing from the Sarajevo City Hall (Vijećnica), shortly before their assassination on 28 June 1914.

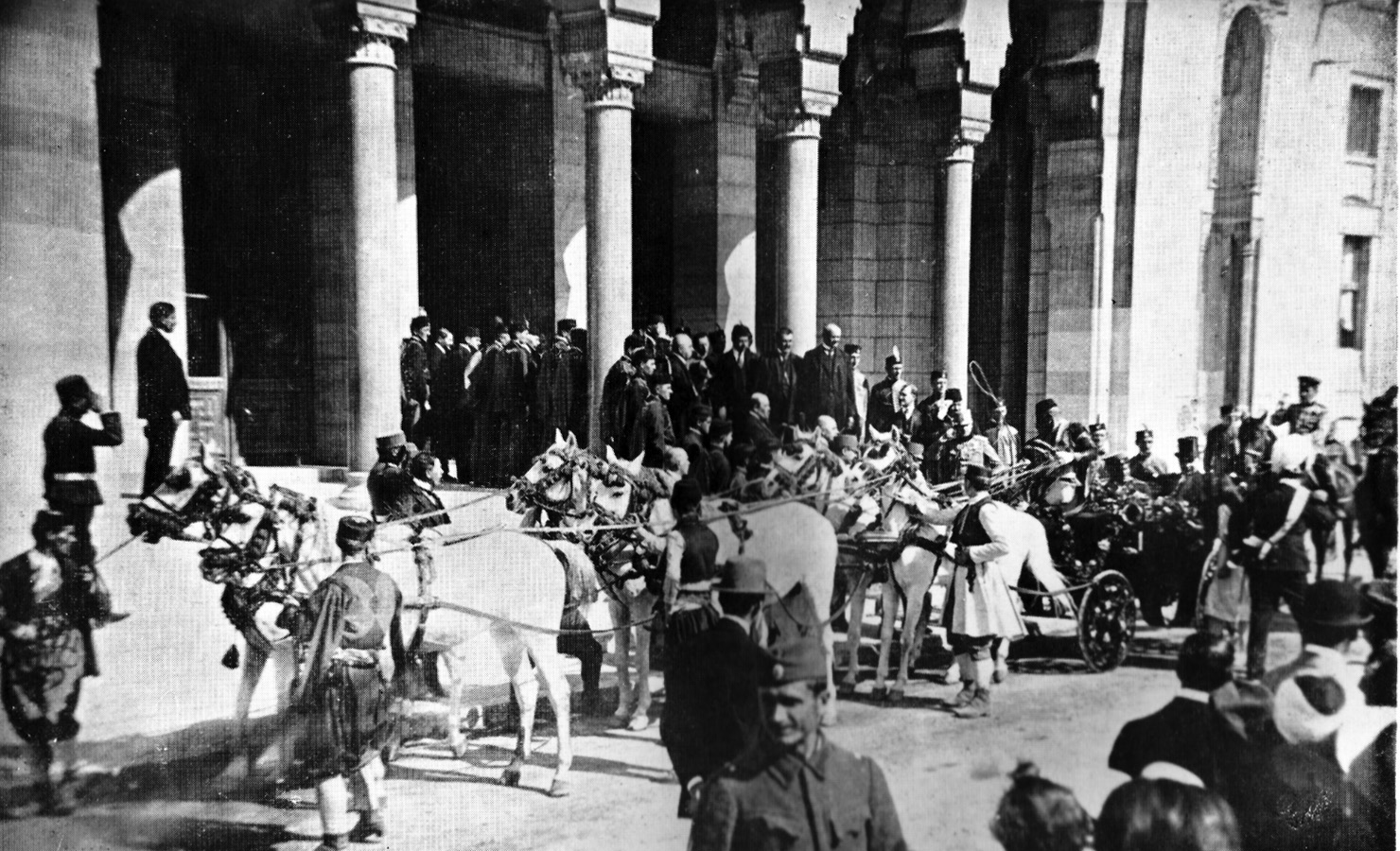
Alexander I of Yugoslavia at the Vijećnica in 1920.

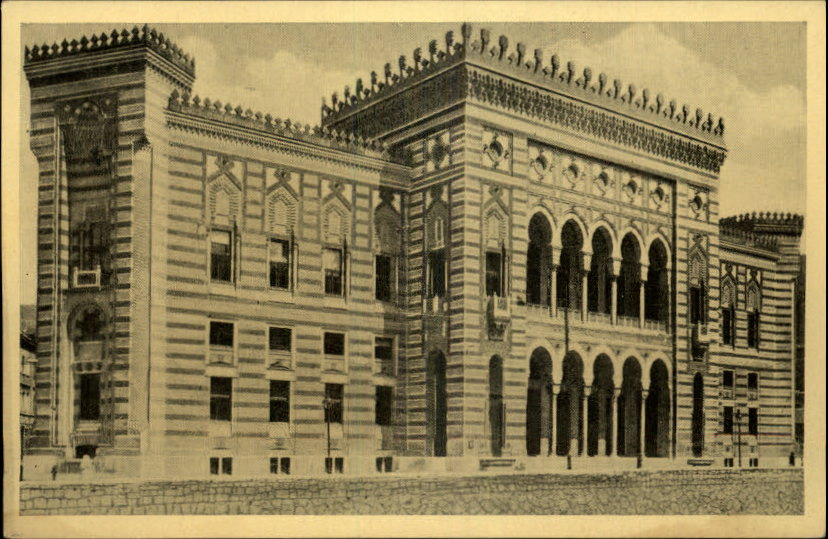
Vijecnica in 1941.

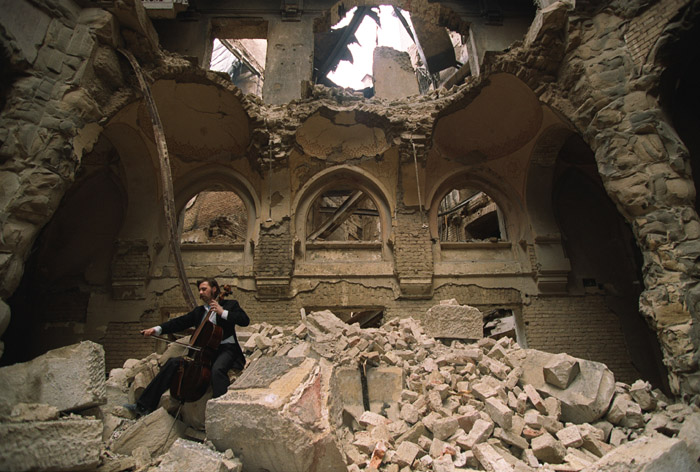
Vedran Smailović playing the cello in the ruins of the National Library (Vijećnica) after it was burnt down during the Siege of Sarajevo, 1992.

== See also ==
- National and University Library of the Republika Srpska
- List of libraries in Bosnia and Herzegovina
