= List of libraries in Bosnia and Herzegovina =

This is a list of libraries in Bosnia and Herzegovina.

== Libraries by locale ==
=== Federation of Bosnia and Herzegovina ===
==== Mostar ====
- Bosnali Ahmed's library, Mostar, est.1653
- Dervish Pasha Library, Mostar, 1593–1890
- Karađoz-beg Library, Mostar, 1570–1934
- Library "Joanikije Pamučinа" in Mostar

==== Sarajevo ====
- Gazi Husrev Bey's Library
- National and University Library of Bosnia and Herzegovina
- National Museum of Bosnia and Herzegovina Library, Sarajevo, est.1888

==== Elsewhere in FBiH ====
- Franciscan friary, Fojnica
- Kalesija City Library, est.2000

=== Republika Srpska ===
- Ćirilo i Metodije National Library in Prijedor
- Filip Višnjić National Library in Bijeljina
- National and University Library of the Republika Srpska
- Parliamentary Library Republika Srpska, Banja Luka
- Tavna monastery library, Bijeljina

== See also ==
- Access to public information in Bosnia and Herzegovina
- COBISS (Co-operative Online Bibliographic System and Services), regional library network in Eastern Europe
- List of archives in Bosnia and Herzegovina
- Literature of Bosnia and Herzegovina
- Mass media in Bosnia and Herzegovina

in other languages

- Library Association of the Republic of Srpska (in Serbian)
