= Association of Writers of Republika Srpska =

Republika Srpska's official writing association

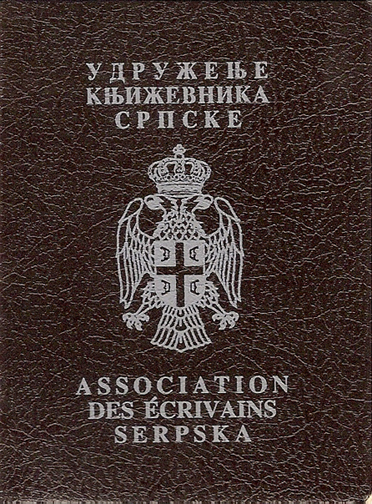
Membership card

The Association of Writers of Republika Srpska (Serbo-Croatian: Udruženje književnika Republike Srpske, Удружење књижевника Републике Српске) is Republika Srpska's official writing association.

== History ==
The association was founded in 1993 on the Jahorina under president Nikola Koljević who was a professor and politician. From 2003, the president of the association Zoran Kostić moved the headquarters from Istočno Sarajevo to Banja Luka.

=== First management ===
The first management of three members was chosen by a secret vote. The management was:

- Nikola Koljević, president
- Nikola Vukolić, vicepresident
- Ranko Popović, secretary.

== Awards ==
- Ribbon for life achievement
- Kočić award
- UKS plaque
- Đuro Damjanović award
- Book of the Year award

== See also ==
- Association of Writers of Bosnia and Herzegovina
