= National and University Library of the Republika Srpska =

Library in Banja Luka

Coordinates: 44.7693°N 17.1914°E

National and University Library of the Republic of Srpska
- Народна и универзитетска библиотека Републике Српске
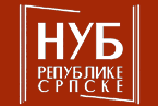
- Location: Banja Luka, Republika Srpska, BiH
- Established: April 26, 1936 (90 years ago)

Collection
- Items collected: books, journals, newspapers, magazines, sound and music recordings, databases, maps, prints, drawings and manuscripts

Other information
- Director: Ljilja Petrović - Zečić
- Website: www.nub.rs

The People and University Library of the Republic of Srpska (NUBRS) (Serbian, Croatian, and Bosnian: Narodna i univerzitetska biblioteka Republike Srpske) is the national library of Republika Srpska, located in the city of Banja Luka, Bosnia and Herzegovina.

== History ==
On 25 November 1935, the Committee for the Establishment of the National Library decided to establish the National Library of King Peter I the Great Liberator.

The House of King Peter I provided the premises for the library and the Ministry of Education designated a primary school teacher as the librarian. The Royal Ban administration of Vrbas municipality in Banja Luka authorized an annual subsidy. The association of Prosvjeta and Serbian Reading Room in Banja Luka donated many books, with other books donated by Gymnasium High School in Banja Luka and other private owners.

The library had 6,000 books. The Prosvjeta Society also borrowed books from the Central Library in Sarajevo.

The library opened on 26 April 1936 as the National Library of King Peter I the Great Liberator. It was the first public library in Banja Luka and the Vrbas Banovina province. It operated on the premises of the House of King Peter the Great Liberator.

The executive board was composed of members of the steering committee for raising the House of King Peter the Great Liberator, from the representatives of the Serbian Reading Room and secondary schools. Dr. Demetrius Zakic participated as the main representative of the Select Committee.

On 30 July 1980 the National Library became the National and University Library "Petar Kocic". In 1999, the Government of the Republika Srpska declared it to be the National and University Library of the Republic of Srpska "Petar Kocic". In December 1999, the National and University Library of the Republic of Srpska "Petar Kocic" was renamed to the National and University Library of the Republic of Srpska.

A postage stamp was issued in Bosnia and Herzegovina in 2011 to commemorate the library's 75th anniversary.

== See also ==
- National and University Library of Bosnia and Herzegovina
- University of Banja Luka
- List of libraries in Bosnia and Herzegovina
