= History of the Jews in Bosnia and Herzegovina =

Bosnian Jews Bosanski Jevreji Bosanski Židovi Босански Јевреји יהודים בוסניים
- The location of Bosnia and Herzegovina (green) in Europe

Total population
- 281

Languages
- Bosnian, Hebrew, Yiddish, Ladino

Religion
- Judaism

The history of the Jews in Bosnia and Herzegovina (Serbo-Croatian: Jevreji Bosne i Hercegovine; Jevrejski narod Bosne i Hercegovine) spans from the arrival of the first Bosnian Jews as a result of the Spanish Inquisition to the survival of the Bosnian Jews through the Holocaust and the Yugoslav Wars. Jews are one of the minority peoples of Bosnia and Herzegovina, according to the country's constitution. The Bosnian Jewish community is composed of both Sephardic and Ashkenazi Jews.

Judaism and the Jewish community in Bosnia and Herzegovina have one of the oldest and most diverse histories of all the former Yugoslav states, and is more than 400 years old, in terms of permanent settlement; records of Jewish presence in Bosnia and Herzegovina date back to the second century CE. Some scholars have argued that there has been a more or less continuous presence of Jews in Bosnia and Herzegovina since the Roman Empire. Bosnia, then a self-governing province of the Ottoman Empire, was one of the few territories in Europe that welcomed Jews after their expulsion from Spain.

At its peak, the Jewish community of Bosnia and Herzegovina numbered between 14,000 and 22,000 members in 1941. Of those, 12,000 to 14,000 lived in Sarajevo, comprising 20% of the city's population.

Today, there are 281 Jews living in Bosnia and Herzegovina, recognised as a national minority. They have good relations with their non-Jewish neighbors, both Muslim and Christian.

== History ==
=== Pre-Ottoman ===
In 1189, Ban Kulin of Bosnia issued a charter that guaranteed mutual free trade and movement for merchants from Dubrovnik through Bosnian territory, which enticed some Jewish merchants to settle in the area. At least one Jewish house of worship from the Middle Ages has survived to provide physical evidence of the presence of Jews in Bosnia and Herzegovina. The remains of a Roman or Byzantine synagogue were found in the village of Dabravine, near Zenica.

=== Ottoman rule ===
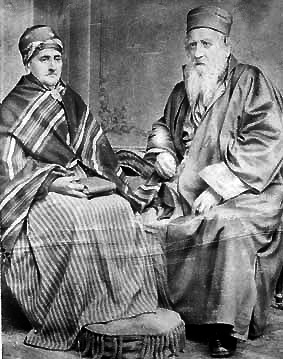
Rabbi Judah Alkalai and his spouse Esther in Vienna in 1874

Jews had been forced to leave Spain by 31 July 1492 by the Alhambra Decree; the day was further delayed to 2 August 1492, which coincided with Tisha B'Av. The first Jews from Spain and Portugal arrived in Bosnia and Herzegovina during the early 1500s.

As tens of thousands of Jews fled the Spanish and Portuguese Inquisitions, Sultan Bayezid II of the Ottoman Empire welcomed Jews who were able to reach his territories. Sephardi Jews fleeing Spain and Portugal were welcomed in – and found their way to – Bosnia and Herzegovina, Macedonia, Thrace and other areas of Europe under Ottoman control. Jews from the Ottoman Empire began arriving in numbers in the 16th century, settling mainly in Sarajevo. The first Ashkenazi Jews arrived from Hungary in 1686, when the Ottoman Turks were expelled from Hungary Among them was Tzvi Ashkenazi, who remained in Sarajevo for three years as rabbi. The Jewish community prospered in Bosnia, living side by side with their Bosnian Muslim neighbors, as one of the largest European centres for Sephardi Jewry outside of Spain.

Jews in the Ottoman Empire were generally well-treated and were recognized under the law as non-Muslims. Despite some restrictions, the Jewish communities of the Empire prospered. They were granted significant autonomy, with various rights including the right to buy real estate, to build synagogues and to conduct trade throughout the Ottoman Empire. Jews, along with the other non-Muslim subjects of the Empire, were granted full equality under Ottoman law by 1856.

In the late Ottoman time, the Sarajevo-based Sephardi rabbi Judah Alkalai played a prominent role as a precursor of modern Zionism by advocating in favor of the restoration of the Jews to the Land of Israel.

=== Habsburg rule ===
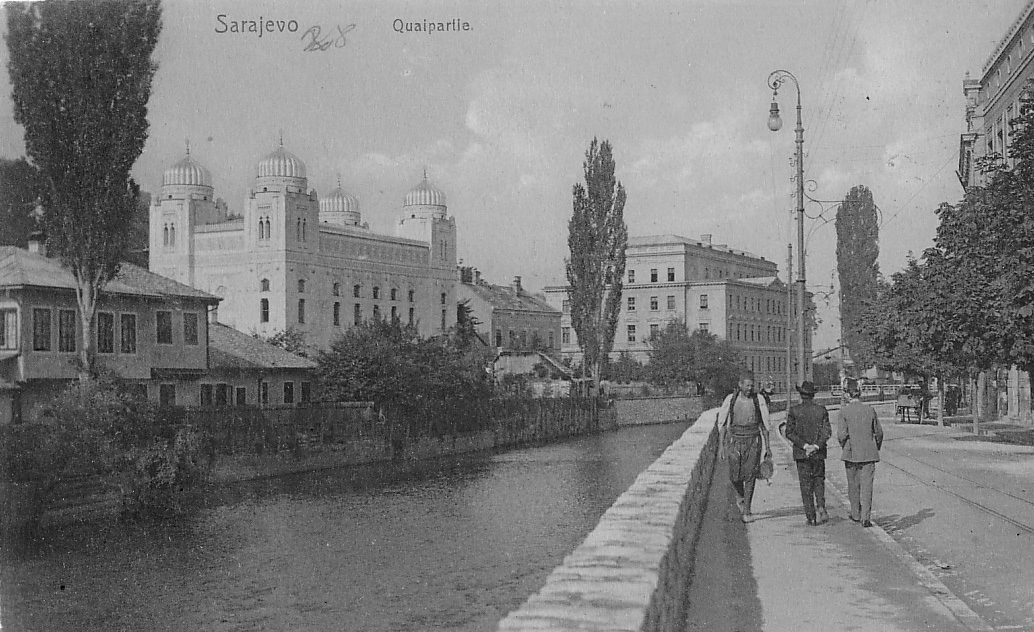
The Sarajevo Ashkenazi Synagogue in 1914 on the banks of the Miljacka

The Austro-Hungarian Empire occupied Bosnia and Herzegovina in 1878, and brought with them an injection of European capital, companies and methods. Many professional, educated Ashkenazi Jews arrived with the Austro-Hungarians. The Sephardi Jews continued to engage in their traditional areas, mainly foreign trade and crafts.

Sephardic Jews have certainly had a stronger role in BiH, given that only in Sarajevo, Banja Luka and Tuzla separate Ashkenazi communities were active, whereas Tuzla was the only city in which the Ashkenazi were numerous (there Hilde Zaloscer was born). In this period Moshe ben Rafael Attias achieved prominence as scholar of the Islamic faith and of medieval Persian literature.

=== Kingdom of Yugoslavia ===
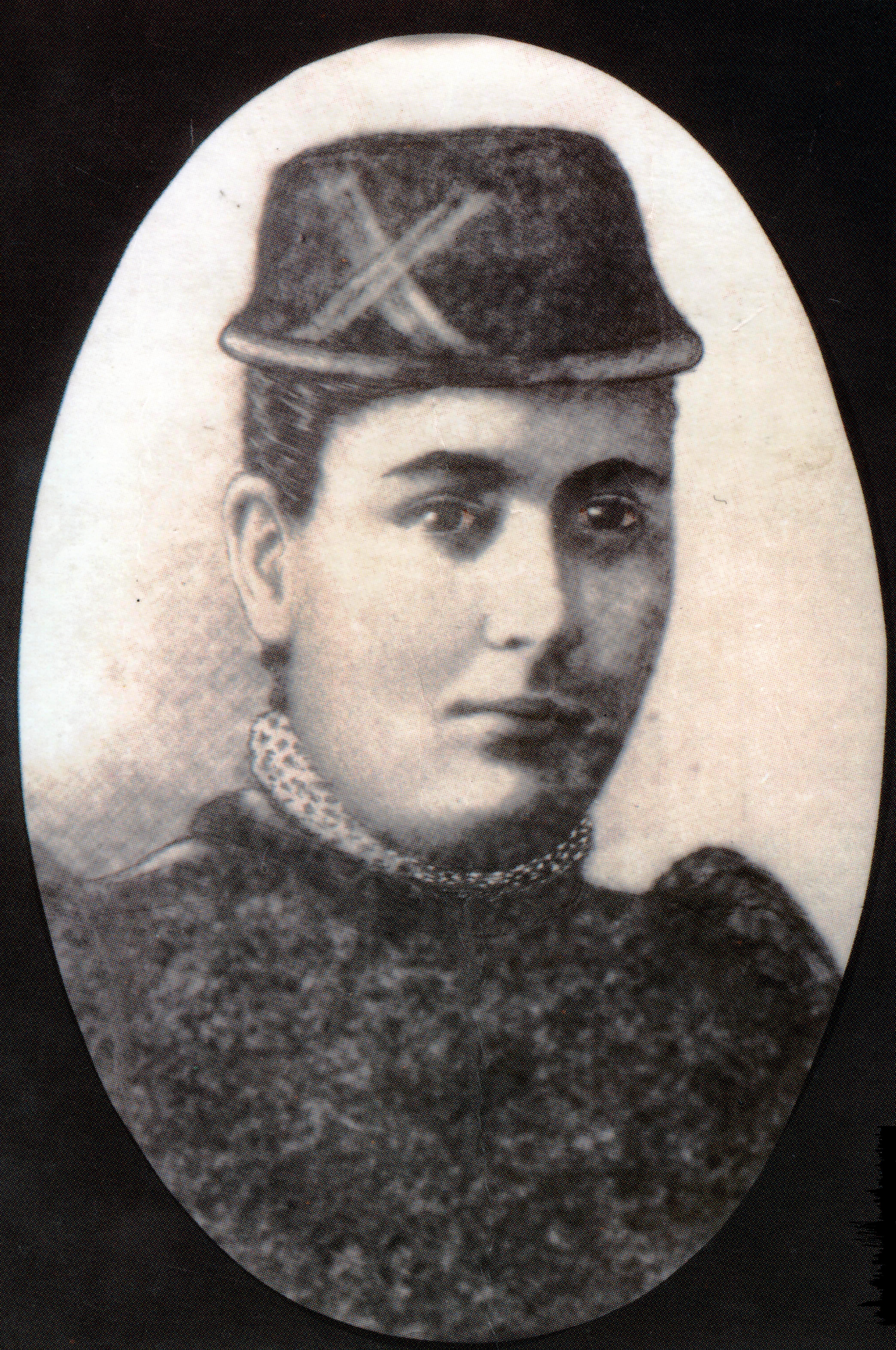
Laura Papo Bohoreta

World War I saw the collapse of the Austro-Hungarian Empire, and after the war Bosnia and Herzegovina was incorporated into the Kingdom of Yugoslavia. In the census of 1921, Ladino was the mother language of 10,000 out of 70,000 inhabitants of Sarajevo. By 1926, there were 13,000 Jews in Bosnia and Herzegovina.

The Bosnian Jewish community remained prominent after the unification of Yugoslavia. In the 1920s and 1930s Kalmi Baruh was a pioneer of Sephardic studies and Hispanic studies and an eminent leftist intellectual. Daniel Ozmo was active in Belgrade as a progressive painter and printmaker. Isak Samokovlija also started his literary career in the 1930s, which he continued after the war. Laura Papo Bohoreta was an active feminist and writer.

=== World War II ===
In 1940, there were approximately 14,000 Jews in Bosnia and Herzegovina, with 10,000 in Sarajevo.

With the invasion of Yugoslavia in April 1941 by the Nazis and their Allies, Bosnia and Herzegovina came under the control of the Independent State of Croatia, a Nazi puppet-state. The Independent State of Croatia was headed by the notoriously anti-Semitic Ustaše, and they wasted little time in persecuting non-Croats such as Serbs, Jews and Romani people.

On 22 July 1941, Mile Budak – a senior Minister in the Croatian government and one of the chief ideologists of the Ustaše movement – declared that the goal of the Ustaše was the extermination of "foreign elements" from the Independent State of Croatia. His message was simple: "The basis for the Ustasha movement is religion. For minorities such as Serbs, Jews, and Gypsies, we have three million bullets." In 1941, Ante Pavelić – leader of the Ustaše movement – declared that "the Jews will be liquidated in a very short time".

In September 1941 deportations of Jews began, with most Bosnian Jews being deported to Auschwitz (many first to Kruščica concentration camp) or to concentration camps in Croatia. The Ustaše set up concentration camps at Kerestinac, Jadovna, Metajna and Slana. The most notorious, where cruelty of unimaginable proportions was perpetrated against Jewish and Serbian prisoners, were at Pag and Jasenovac. At Jasenovac alone, approximately one hundred thousand people were murdered (half of whom were Serbs), including 20,000 Jews.

By War's end, 10,000 of the pre-War Bosnian Jewish population of 14,000 had been murdered. Most of the 4,000 who had survived did so by fighting with the Yugoslav, Jewish or Soviet Partisans or by escaping to the Italian controlled zone (approximately 1,600 had escaped to the Italian controlled zone on the Dalmatian coast - among them Flory Jagoda, née Papo). Jewish members of the Yugoslav Army became German prisoners of war and survived the war. They returned to Sarajevo after the war. Avraham Levi-Lazzaris, who emigrated to Brasil, became explorer of the first mines of diamonds in Rondônia, while Moses Levi-Lazzaris (1944–1990), mechanical engineer, became a Trotskyist militant.

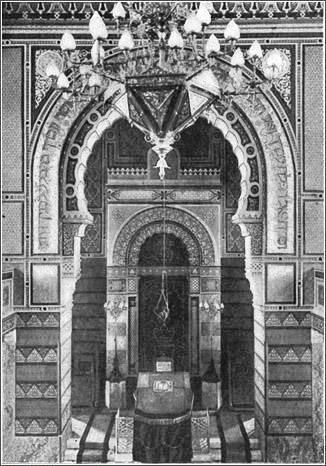
Interior of Sarajevo's Old Temple (before 1940)

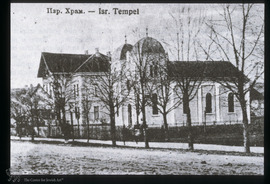
Banja Luka Synagogue (1884–1941)

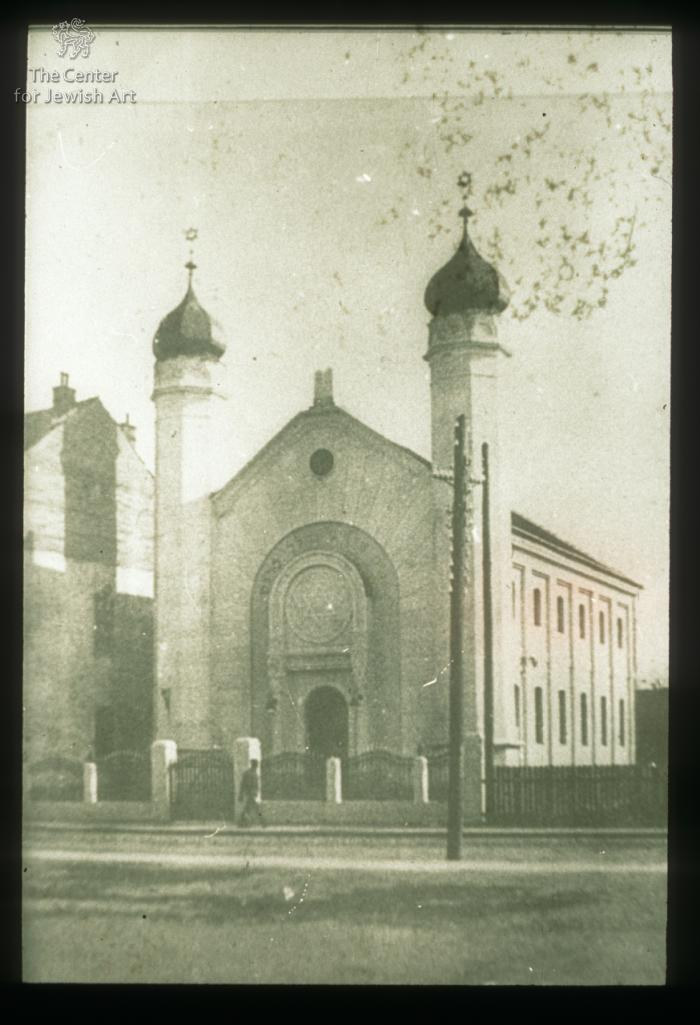
Bijeljina Synagogue (1900–1941)

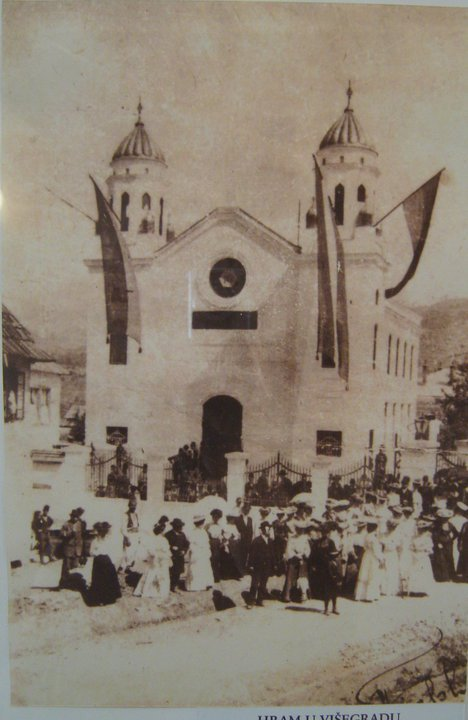
Višegrad Synagogue (1905–1941)

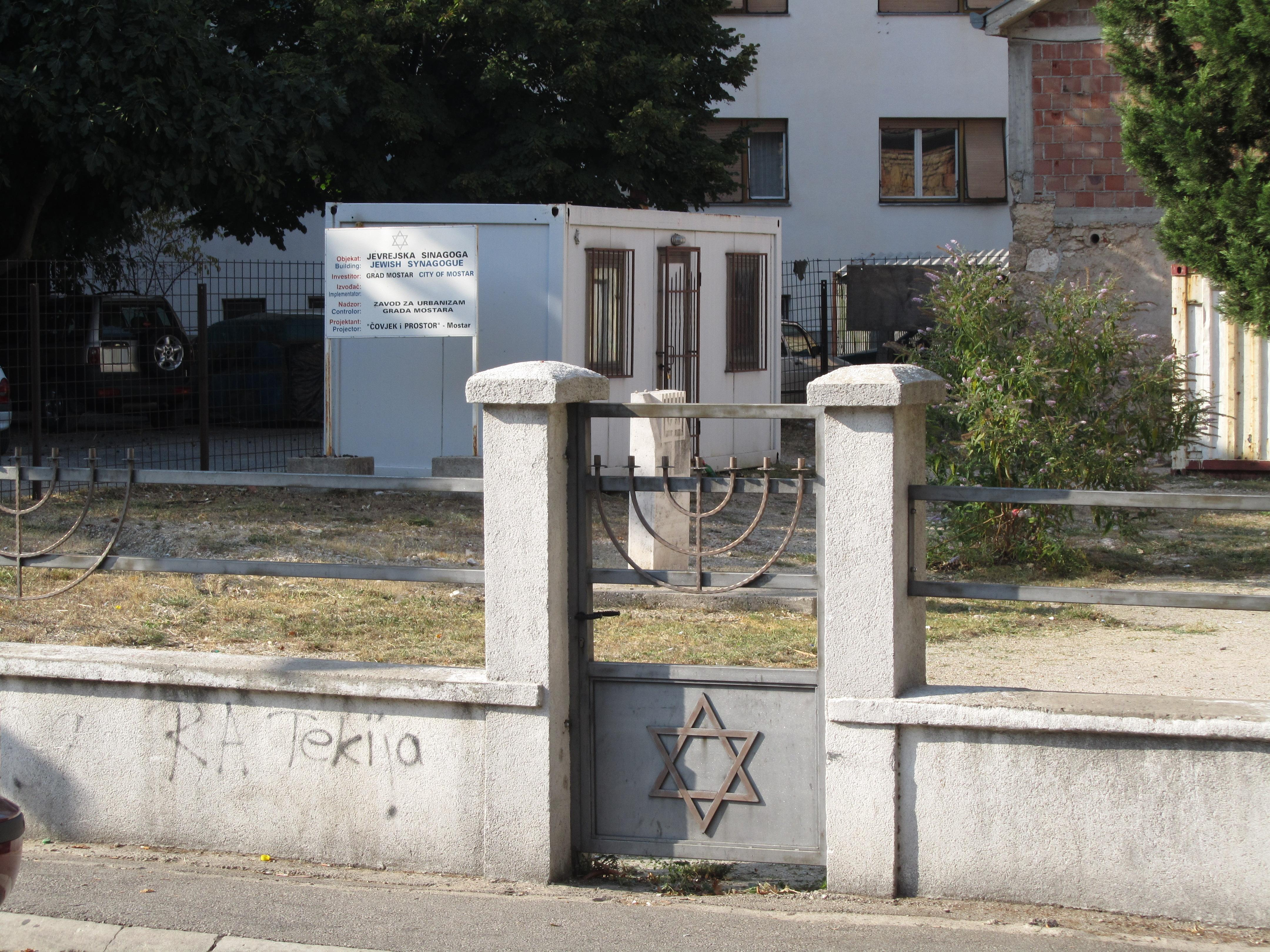
Site of the proposed Mostar Synagogue

==== Righteous among the Nations from Bosnia and Herzegovina ====
The people of Sarajevo helped many Jews to abscond and exfiltrate - among many, the story of the Hardaga and Kabilio families as well as of the Sober-Dragoje and Besrević families became particularly noteworthy after the war. The Righteous among the Nations from Bosnia and Herzegovina are those Bosnians who were honored by the Yad Vashem Memorial as Righteous Among the Nations, i.e. non-Jews who risked their lives to save Jews from being murdered. Forty-nine Bosnians have been awarded the title of Righteous Among the Nations.

=== Socialist Yugoslavia ===
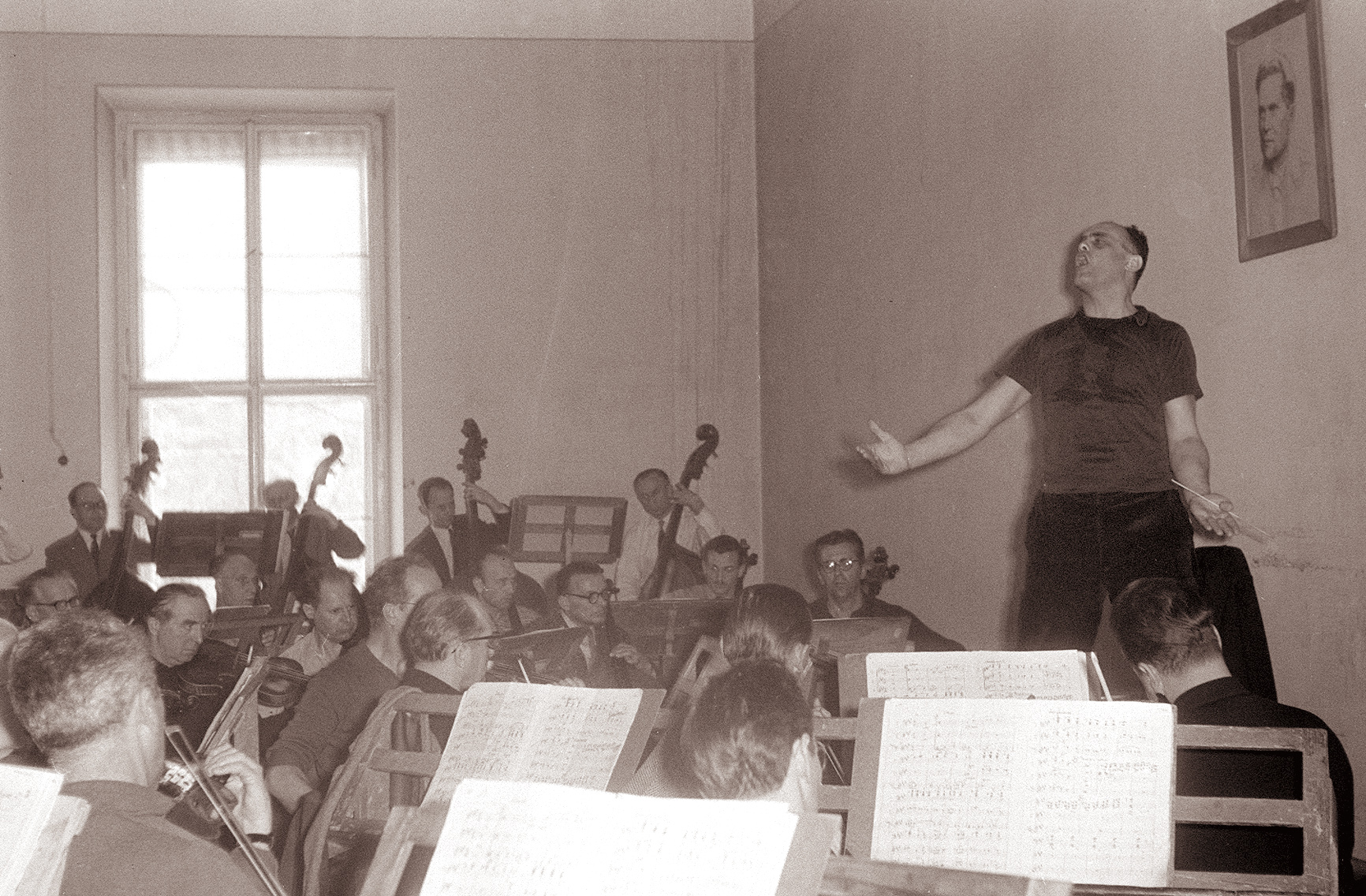
Oskar Danon during practice with the Maribor Symphony Orchestra in 1961

The Jewish Community of Bosnia and Herzegovina was reconstituted after the Holocaust, but most survivors chose to emigrate to Israel. The community came under the auspices of the Federation of Jewish Communities in Yugoslavia, based in the capital, Belgrade.

Jewish personalities remained prominent in Socialist Bosnia and Herzegovina. Cvjetko Rihtman was the first director of the Sarajevo Opera in 1946–1947; his son Ranko would later be part of the Sarajevo rock band Indexi. Oskar Danon also achieved fame as composer and conductor during Yugoslav times. Ernest Grin was one of the leading Yugoslav medical doctors and a member of the Bosnia and Herzegovina Academy of Sciences and Arts. Emerik Blum, founder of Energoinvest, was Sarajevo's mayor from 1981 to 1983 and a member of the Organizational Committee of the 1984 Winter Olympics. Ivan Ceresnjes was active as an architect, supervising the restoration of Jewish buildings and sites, including the Ashkenazi Synagogue, the Kal Nuevo temple, and the 16th-century Old Jewish Cemetery, Sarajevo, whose project he was slated to present 24h before the war broke out in March 1992.

In the early 1990s, before the Yugoslav Wars, the Jewish population of Bosnia and Herzegovina was over 2,000, and relations between Jews and their Catholic, Orthodox, and Muslim neighbors were very good.

=== War in Bosnia and Herzegovina ===
The Jewish community of Bosnia and Herzegovina was headed by Ivan Ceresnjes from 1992 until his emigration to Israel in 1996. His tenure coincided with the Bosnian War of 1992–1995. When the besieging Serb army occupied the Jewish cemetery in Sarajevo, from where they sniped on the city, Ceresnjes gave permission to the Army of the Republic of Bosnia and Herzegovina to target the cemetery.

The Sarajevo Jewish humanitarian society, La Benevolencija, also provided aid to thousands of besieged Sarajevo residents, supplying food, medicine, and postal and radio communications. Ceresnjes told a local paper that the nonsectarian relief effort was partly a gesture of gratitude to local Muslims who had hidden Jews during the Nazi occupation of Yugoslavia. After the war started, La Benevolencija assisted the American Jewish Joint Distribution Committee in the evacuation of 2,500 Sarajevo residents, only one-third of whom were Jewish. There were 11 evacuations in all, three by air early on in the war, and eight by bus convoy after the airport had been closed to civilian traffic. While other convoys were stopped, the Ceresnjes convoys all got through, as field staff from the Joint negotiated cease fires to ensure safe transfer.

In 1997, the Jewish population of Bosnia and Herzegovina was 600, about half of whom were living in Sarajevo. Most Jews who had fled Sarajevo and Bosnia chose to remain in Israel after the wars had ended, though some returned and others moved elsewhere, such as Robert Rothbart (born Boris Kajmaković).

=== Independent Bosnia and Herzegovina ===
The Jewish Community in Bosnia and Herzegovina has been led by Jakob Finci since 1995. The Constitution of Bosnia and Herzegovina reserves certain top political positions, including membership of the Presidency and of the House of Peoples to members of the three constitutive peoples (Bosniaks, Croats and Serbs). In 2009 the European Court of Human Rights established in the Sejdić and Finci v. Bosnia and Herzegovina ruling that the country's Constitution violates the European Convention on Human Rights. An agreement between political parties to amend the Constitution accordingly is still pending, notwithstanding international pressure. This has not prevented Bosnian Jews from achieving prominent positions: among them, Sven Alkalaj was Minister of Foreign Affairs from 2007 to 2012.

In 2024, Jews and Muslims from Bosnia and Herzegovina jointly observed International Holocaust Remembrance Day to facilitate dialogue and respect in response to the Gaza war.

== Culture ==
=== Sarajevo Haggadah ===
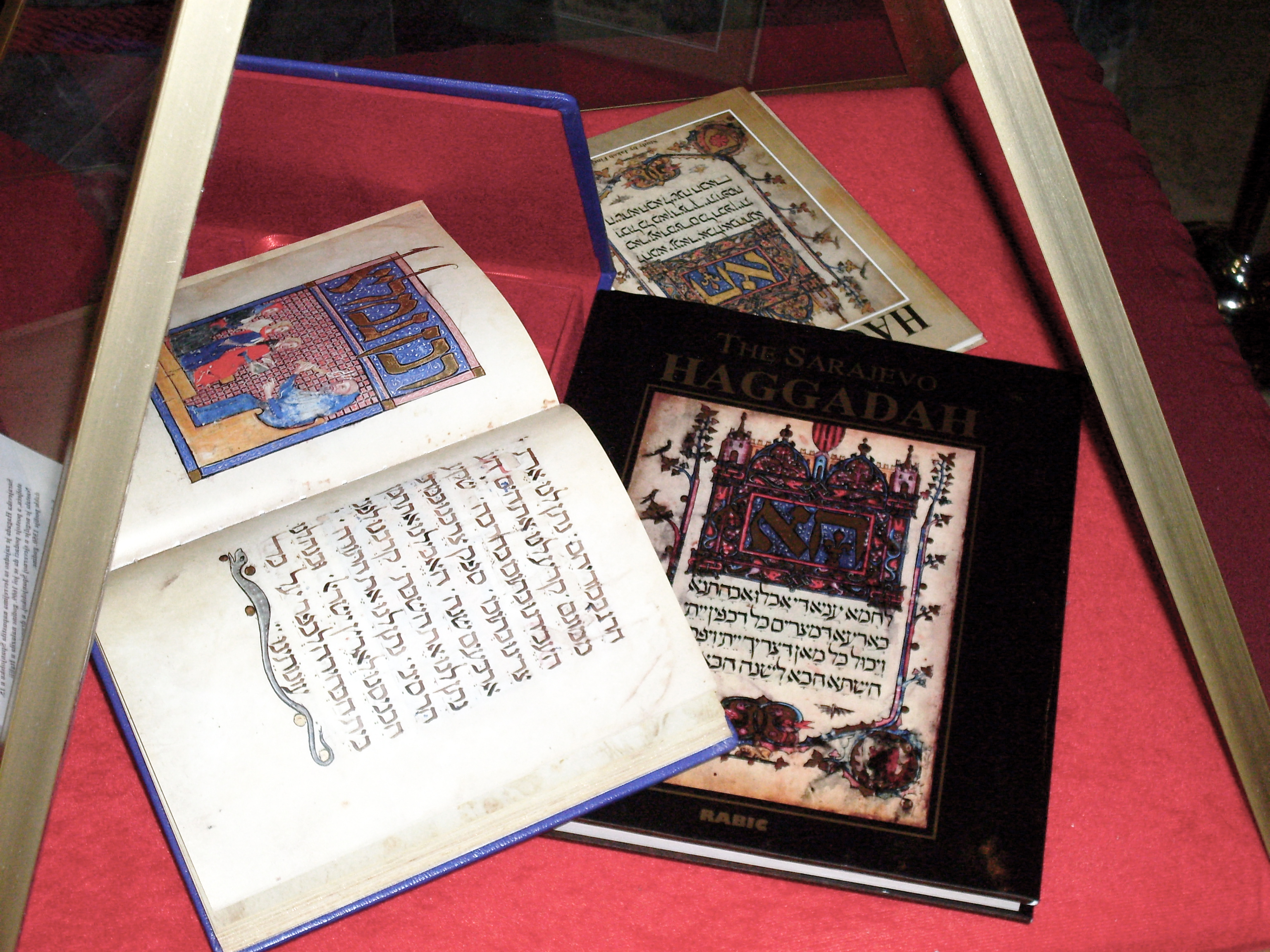
Sarajevo Haggadah

The Sarajevo Haggadah is a 14th-century illuminated manuscript which has survived many close calls with destruction. Historians believe that it was taken out of Spain by Spanish Jews who were expelled by the Inquisition in 1492. Notes in the margins of the Haggadah indicate that it surfaced in Italy in the 16th century. It was sold to the national museum in Sarajevo in 1894 by a man named Joseph Kohen.

During World War II, the manuscript was hidden from the Nazis by Dr. Jozo Petrovic, the director of the city museum and by Derviš Korkut, the chief librarian, who smuggled the Haggadah out to a Muslim cleric in a mountain village near Treskavica, where it was hidden in the mosque among Korans and other Islamic texts. During the Bosnian War of 1992–1995, when Sarajevo was under constant siege by Bosnian Serb forces, the manuscript survived in an underground bank vault.

Afterwards, the manuscript was restored through a special campaign financed by the United Nations and the Bosnian Jewish community in 2001, and went on permanent display at the museum in December 2002.

=== Synagogues ===
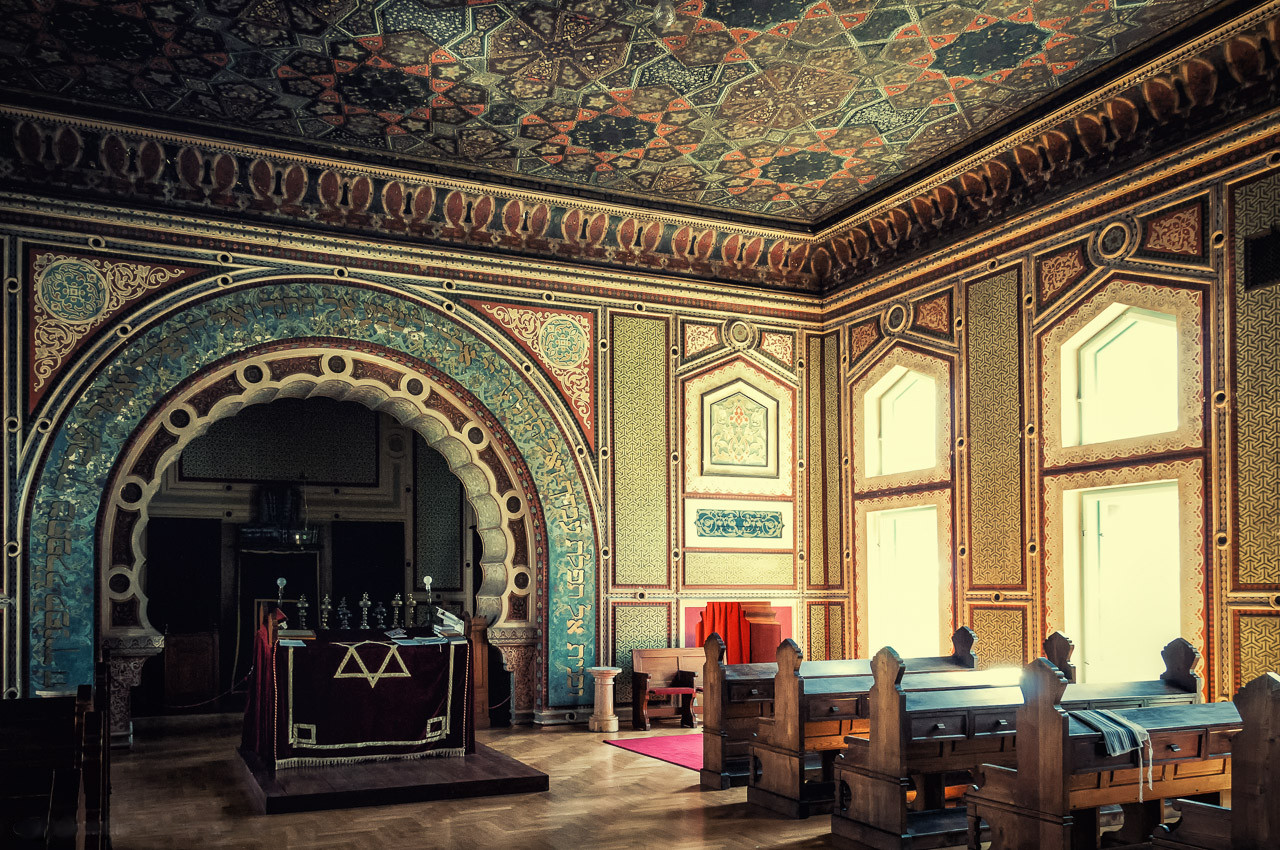
Interior of the Sarajevo Ashkenazi Synagogue

The oldest synagogues in Bosnia and Herzegovina were built by the Sephardi community in the 16th century. During the Austro-Hungarian period, the new Ashkenazi community also built their own temples, often adopting the Moorish Revival architectural style, as in the case of Sarajevo's Ashkenazi Synagogue. Most of them were destroyed during World War Two, including Sarajevo's Il Kal Grande. Four synagogues remain in Sarajevo:

- The Old Temple (Stari Hram/Kal Vježu, also known as Sijavuš-pašina daira or Velika Avlija): A Sephardi synagogue together with a large inn named the Great Courtyard is known to have been built in 1581 with the donation of Turkish Beylerbey Sijamush Pasha to help the poor members of the Jewish community in Sarajevo. It endured two fires in 1697 and 1768. The temple's current looks stems from restoration/renovations in 1821. It now serves as a Jewish museum.
- The New Temple (Novi Hram/Kal Nuevo): Built alongside the Old Temple, today it serves as an art gallery owned by the Jewish community of Sarajevo.
- The Bjelave Synagogue (Kal Di La Bilava): During WW2 the building was confiscated by the Ustaše and was used as a detention facility.
- The Ashkenazi Synagogue: Designed by Karel Pařík and built in 1902 for the growing Ashkenazi community in the Moorish Revival architectural style.

== Jewish communities ==
=== Jewish Municipality of Sarajevo ===
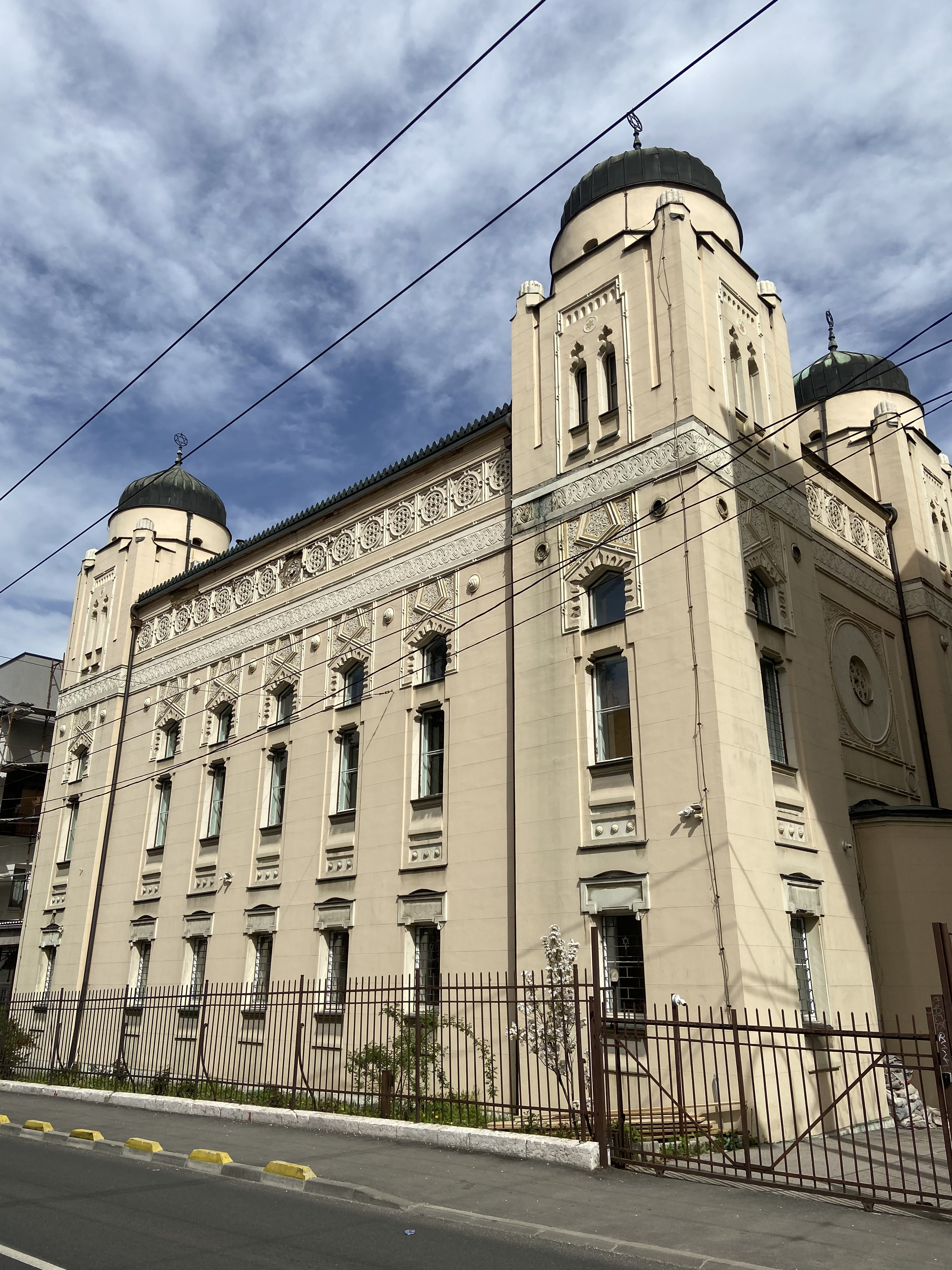
The Sarajevo Synagogue has been designated as a national monument by the KONS of Bosnia and Herzegovina

The Jewish Municipality of Sarajevo, also the Jewish community of Sarajevo, is a religious organization of citizens of Bosnia and Herzegovina of Jewish origin with a seat in Sarajevo.

The history of Jewish immigration to Bosnia and Herzegovina and Sarajevo began in 1492 after the Spanish Catholic state under Ferdinand and Isabella managed to break the power of the Muslim rulers in Spain. For the remaining citizens of the Muslim and Jewish faiths, a time of discrimination and pressure to accept Christianity or leave has begun. At that moment, the Ottoman government allowed Jewish exiles from Spain to settle in their territory. Around 1551, the first Jewish families moved to Sarajevo, and as early as 1565, a Jewish (Sephardic) municipality was founded in Sarajevo. At the request of Sarajevo's Muslim leaders, Kanijeli Siyavuş Pasha, when he arrived in Sarajevo in 1581, had a large inn built as apartments for Jews, in order to live as a special people in the city. However, the Ottoman government did not impose on the Jews the ghetto provisions first established by the Christian rulers. Siyavuş Pasha managed to get permission from the sultan for the Jews of Sarajevo to build their own synagogue.

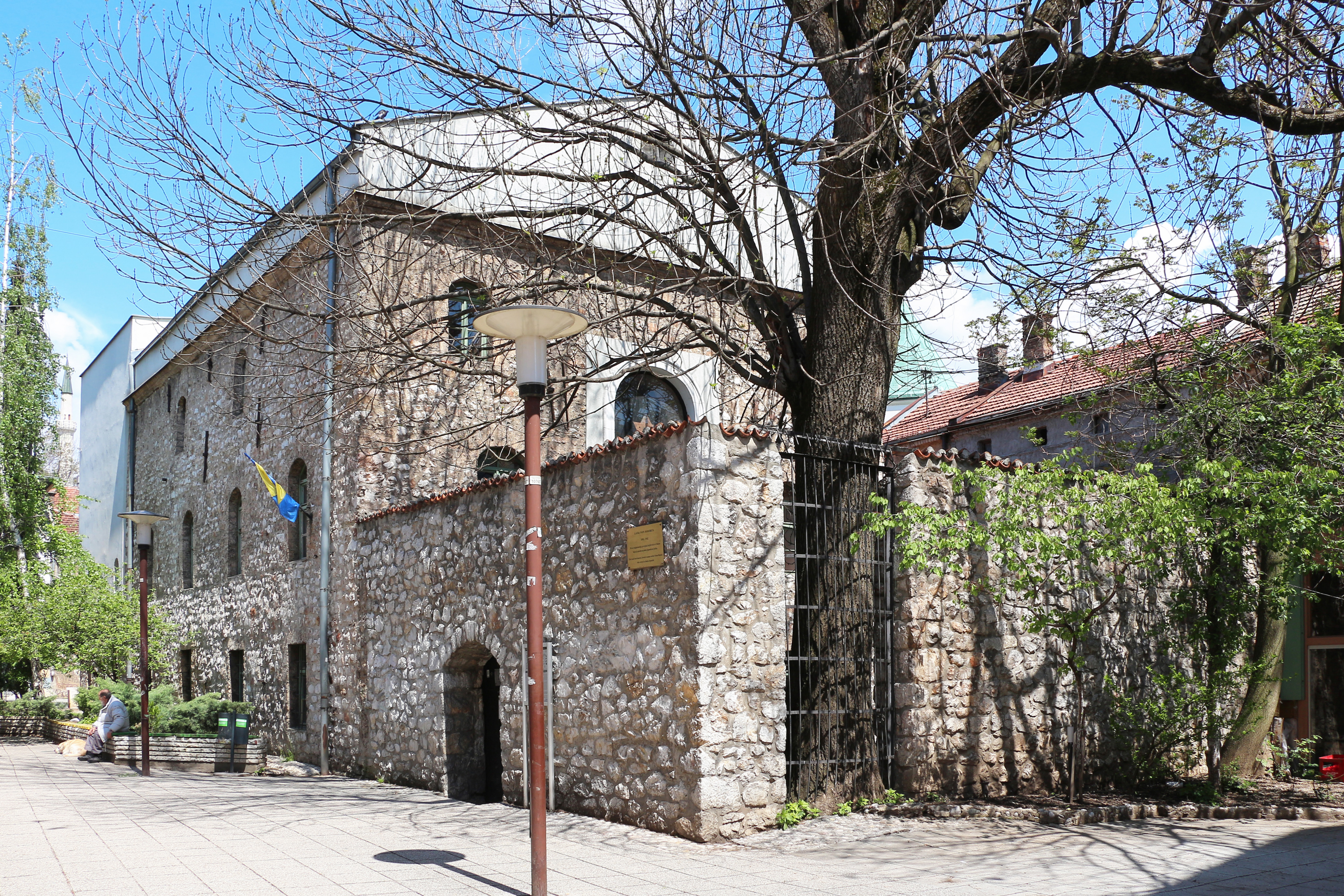
Sarajevo's Old Temple (Kal Vježu)

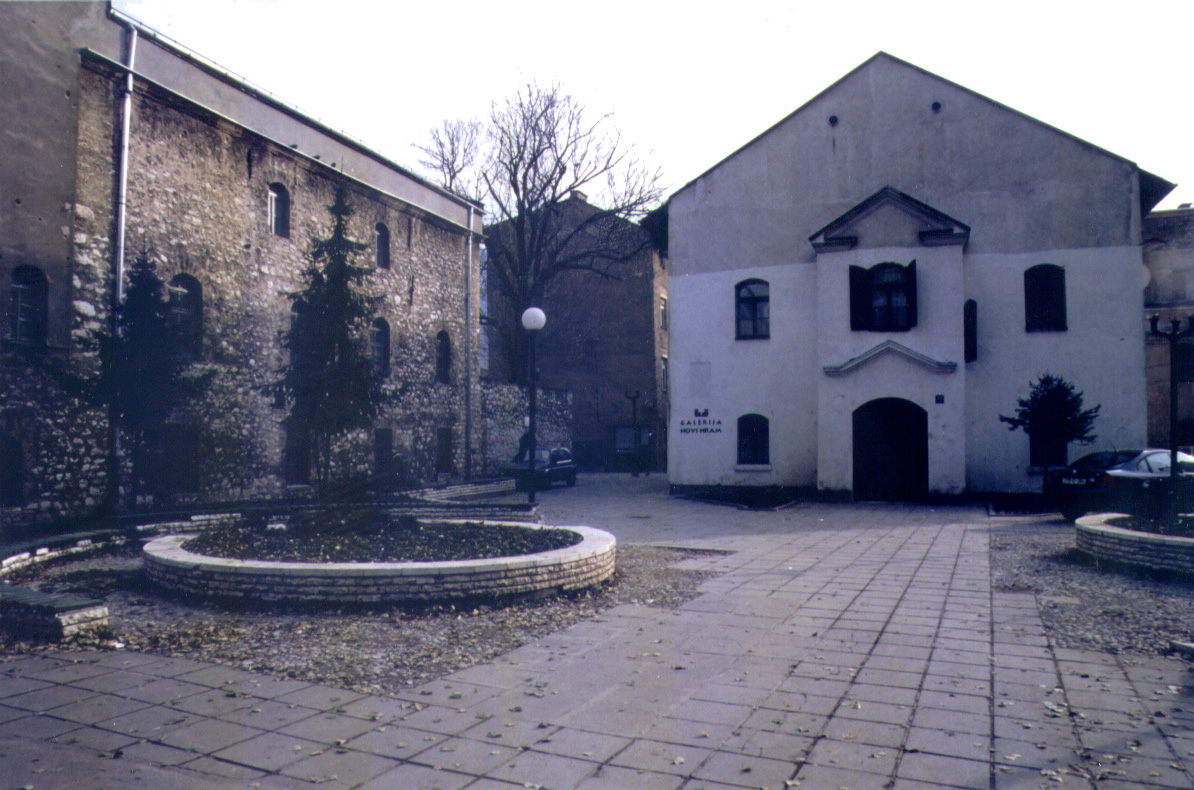
Sarajevo's New Temple (Kal Nuevo)

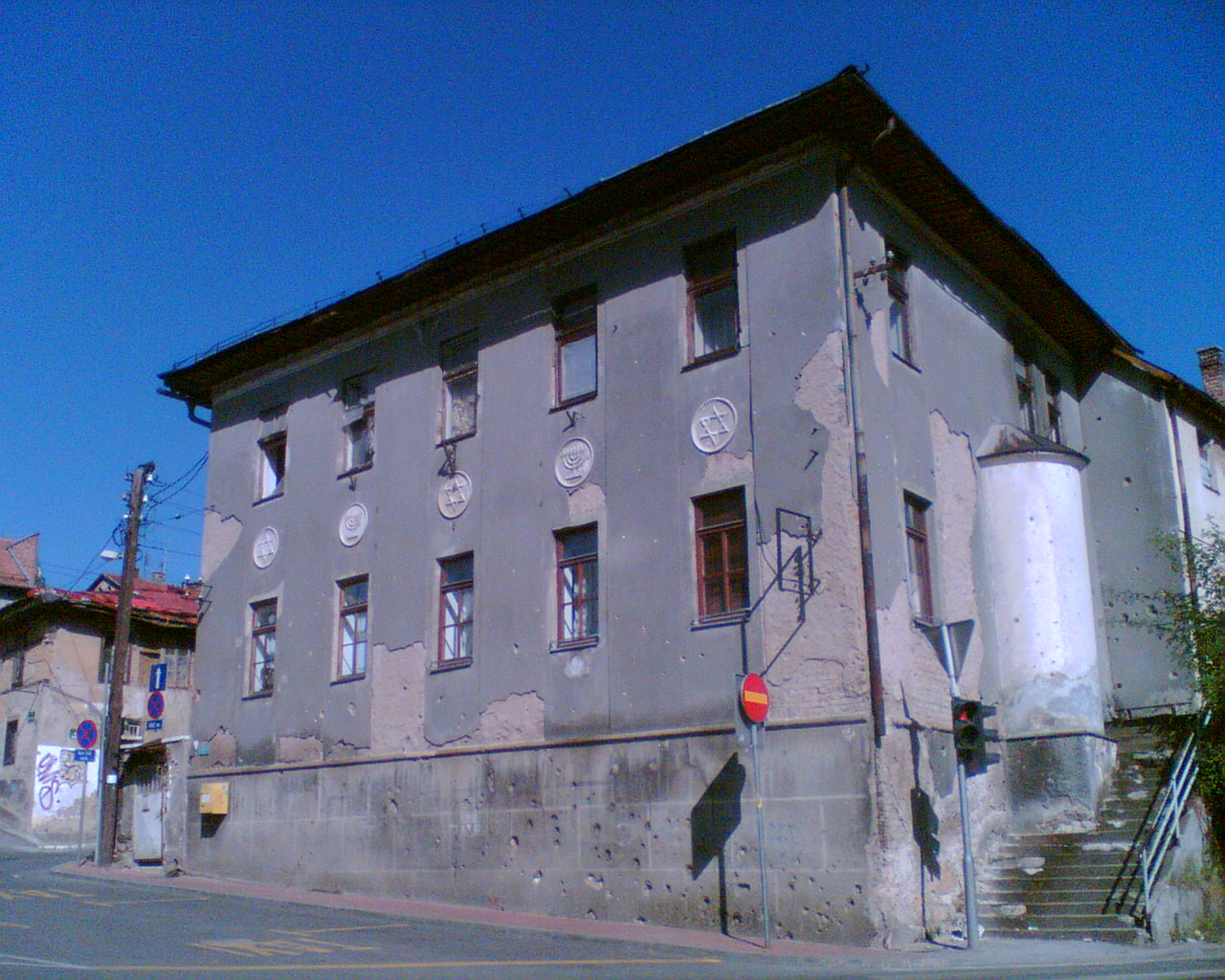
Sarajevo's Bjelave (Mejtaš) Synagogue (Kal di la Bilava)

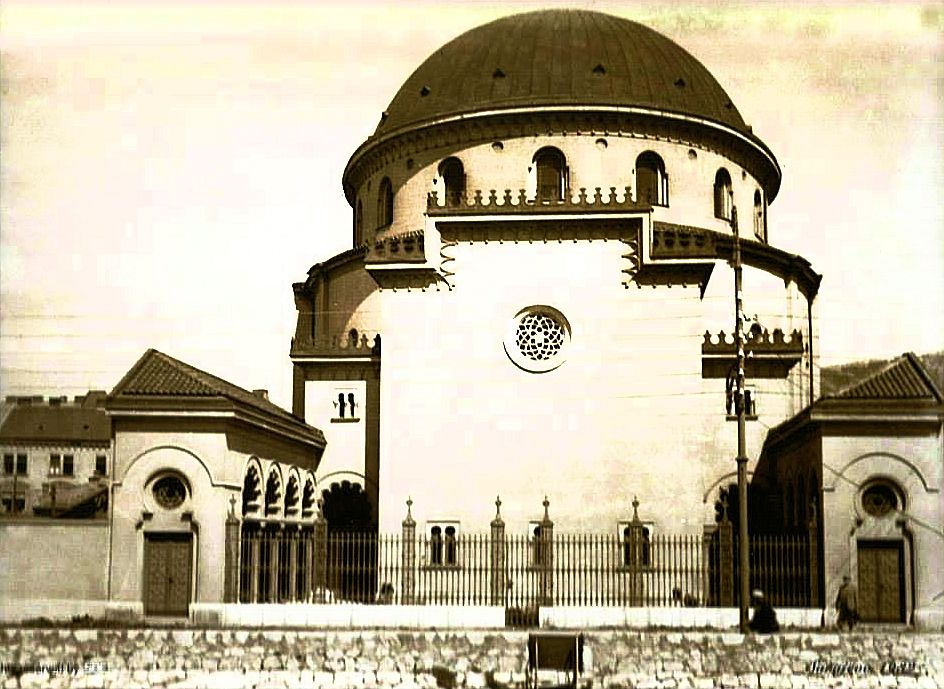
Postcard of Il Kal Grande between 1932 and 1941

=== In other cities and towns ===
==== Jewish community in Doboj ====
In the rest of the country some synagogue buildings have been preserved and renovated (such as in Doboj) but they do not host services.

==== History of Jews in Banja Luka ====
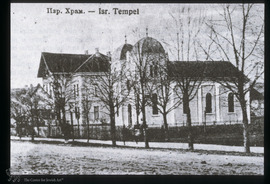
Banja Luka's old synagogue before World War II

Sephardi Jews were first mentioned in Banja Luka in the 16th century. Till the Austro-Hungarian time, the Jewish population of Banja Luka was exclusively of Sephardi Jews, originating from Spain and Portugal. They were into crafts and trade; crafts are practiced by the poorer Jews while those somewhat better off were into trade. Since 1878, Jews have given great impetus expansion of the capitalist economy and the spread of Western European ideas in Banja Luka. According to data from 1815 to 1878, holders of import-export trade were Serbs, Jews, and Muslims are oriented towards the internal trade and handicrafts. Ashkenazi also settled in town in the 19th century. Before World War II, Banja Luka's Jewish Community consisted of a few hundred families. They were nearly all wiped out during the Holocaust in Yugoslavia. Today the number of Jewish families in Banja Luka is in the order of tens. The Jewish cultural center Arie Livne was opened in Banja Luka in 2015.

=== Cemeteries ===
- Old Jewish Cemetery, Sarajevo
- Rogatica Jewish Cemetery: established in 1900, it hosts 16 tombstones plus 10 others probably older, stones sunk in the ground. Tumbs hold inscriptions in Hebrew, Ladino and Serbo-Croatian. There is also a memorial to the victims in the Second World War.
- Burial site of Rabbi Moshe Danon in Stolac (1832, The Sarajevo Megilla), restored by Ivan Ceresnjes in 1990-1991
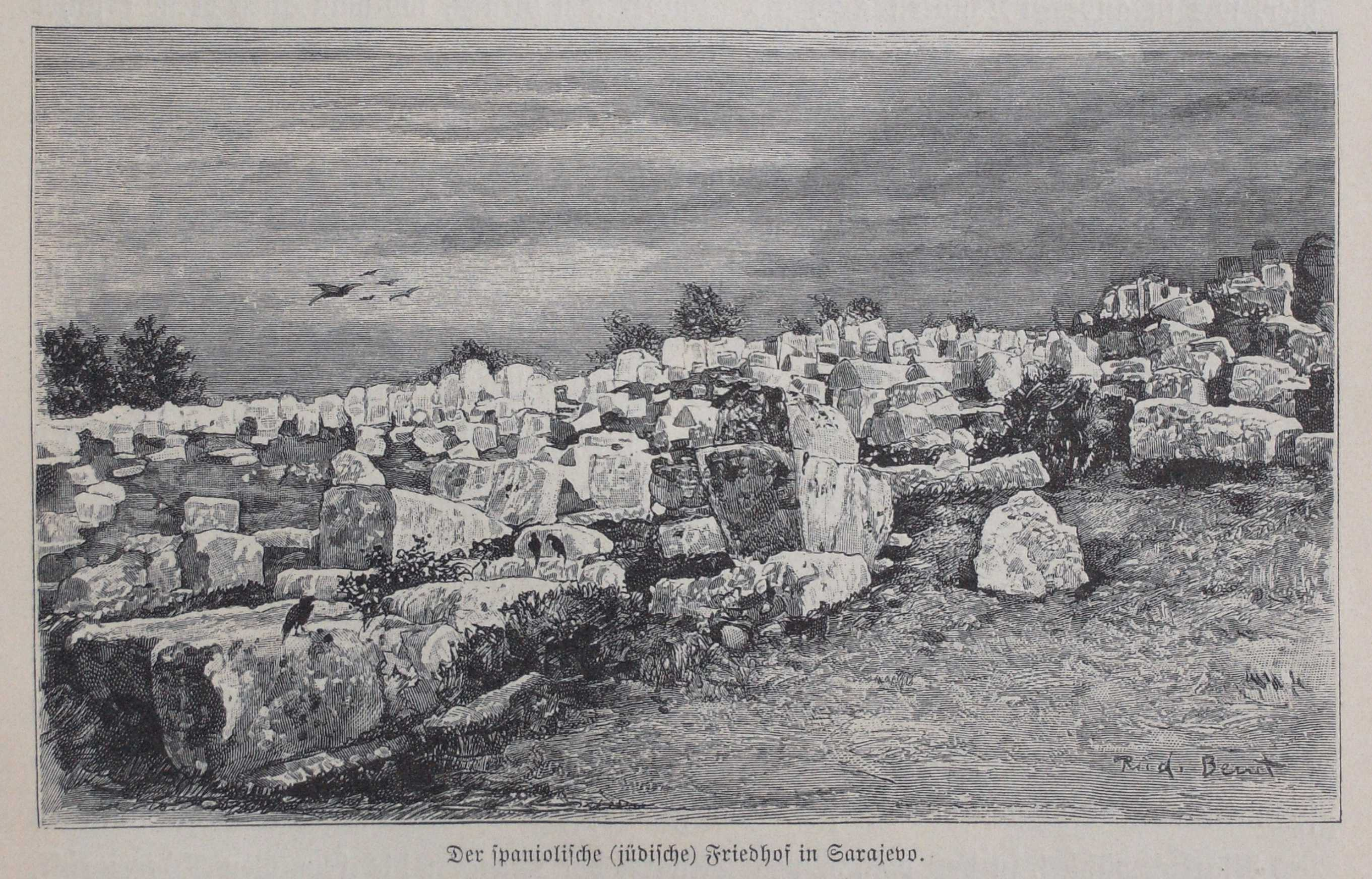
Sarajevo's Old Jewish Cemetery in a 1900 print

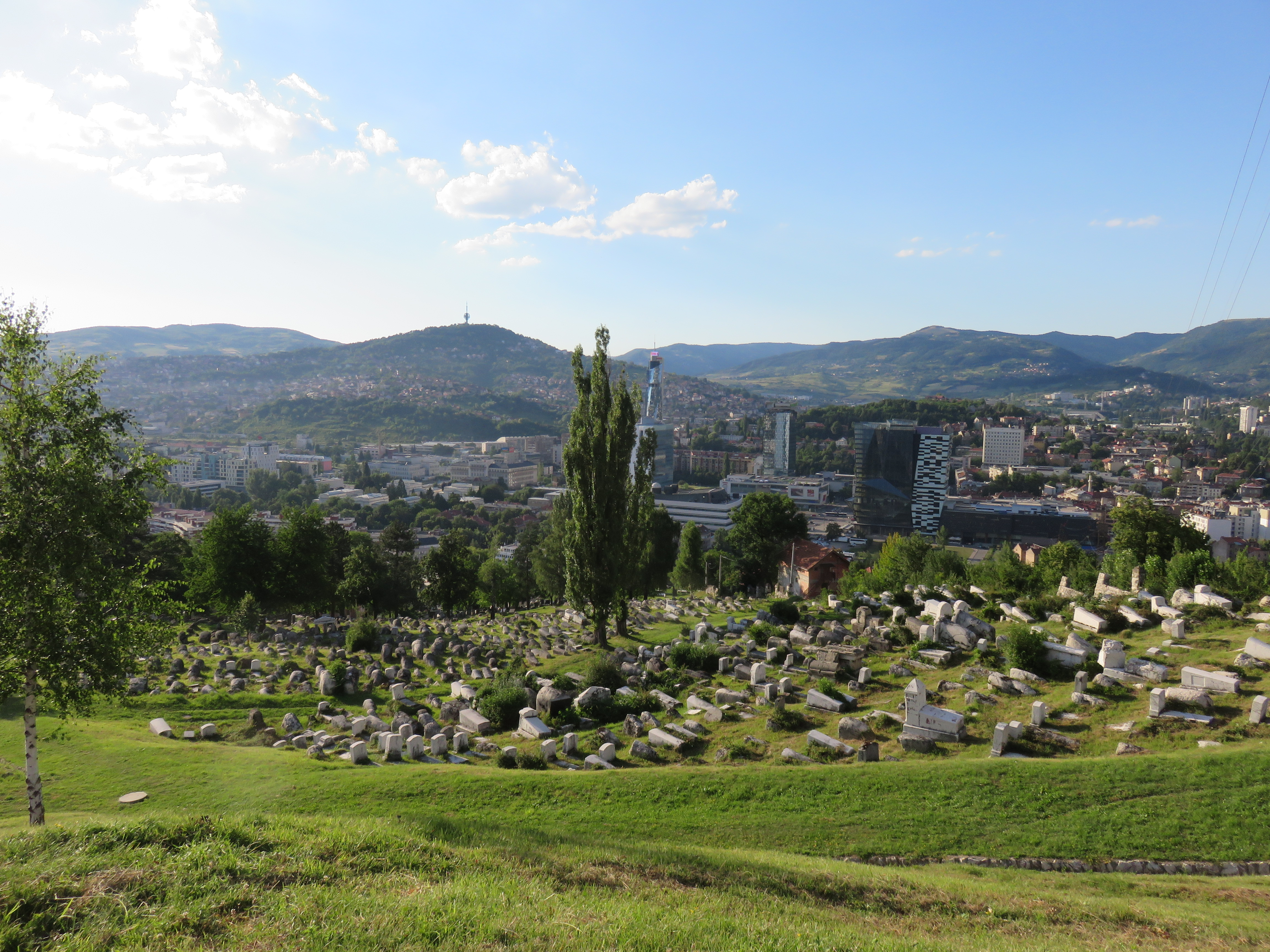
View of Sarajevo from the Old Jewish Cemetery

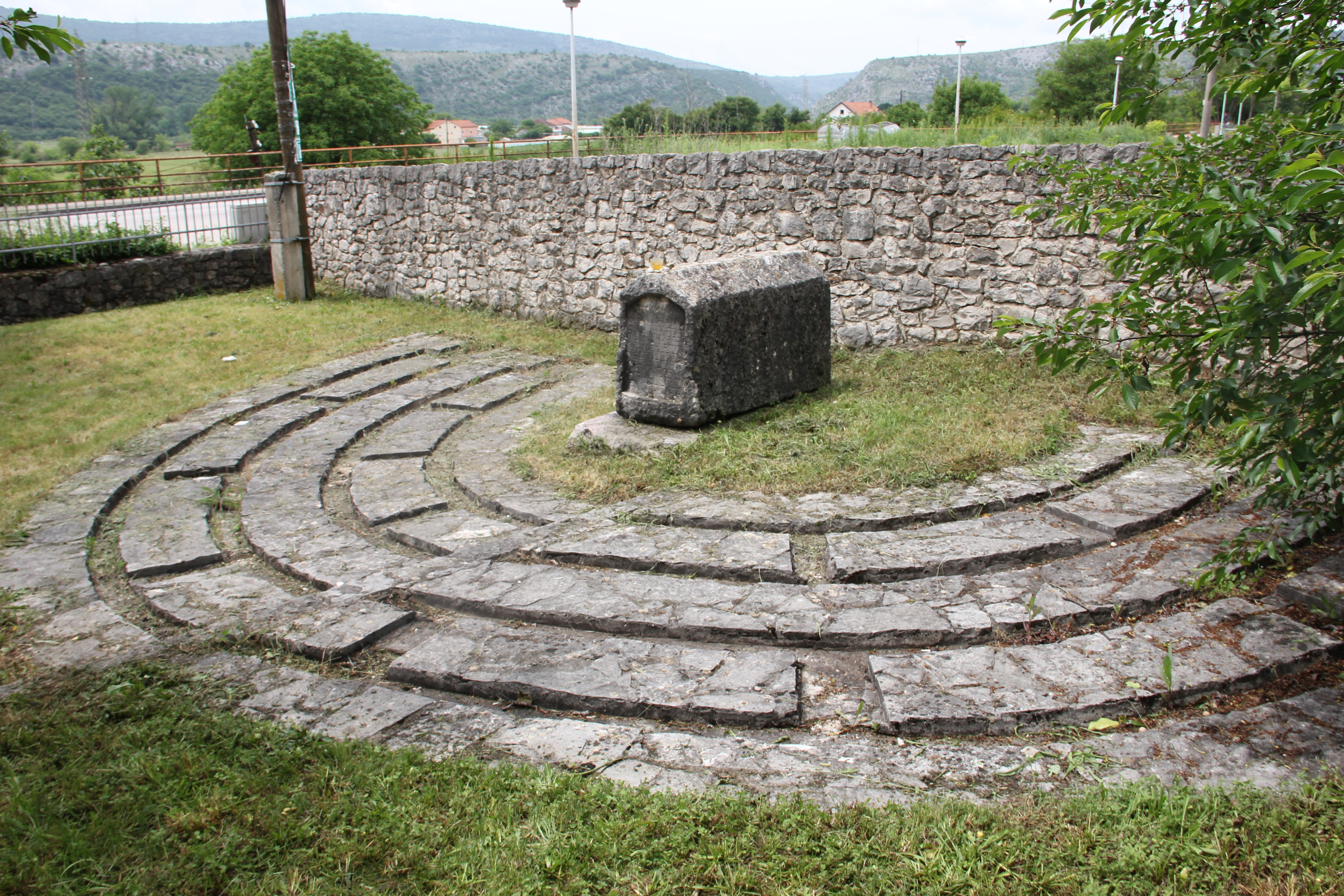
The grave of Rabbi Moshe Danon, chief Rabbi of Sarajevo (1815-1830) in Stolac

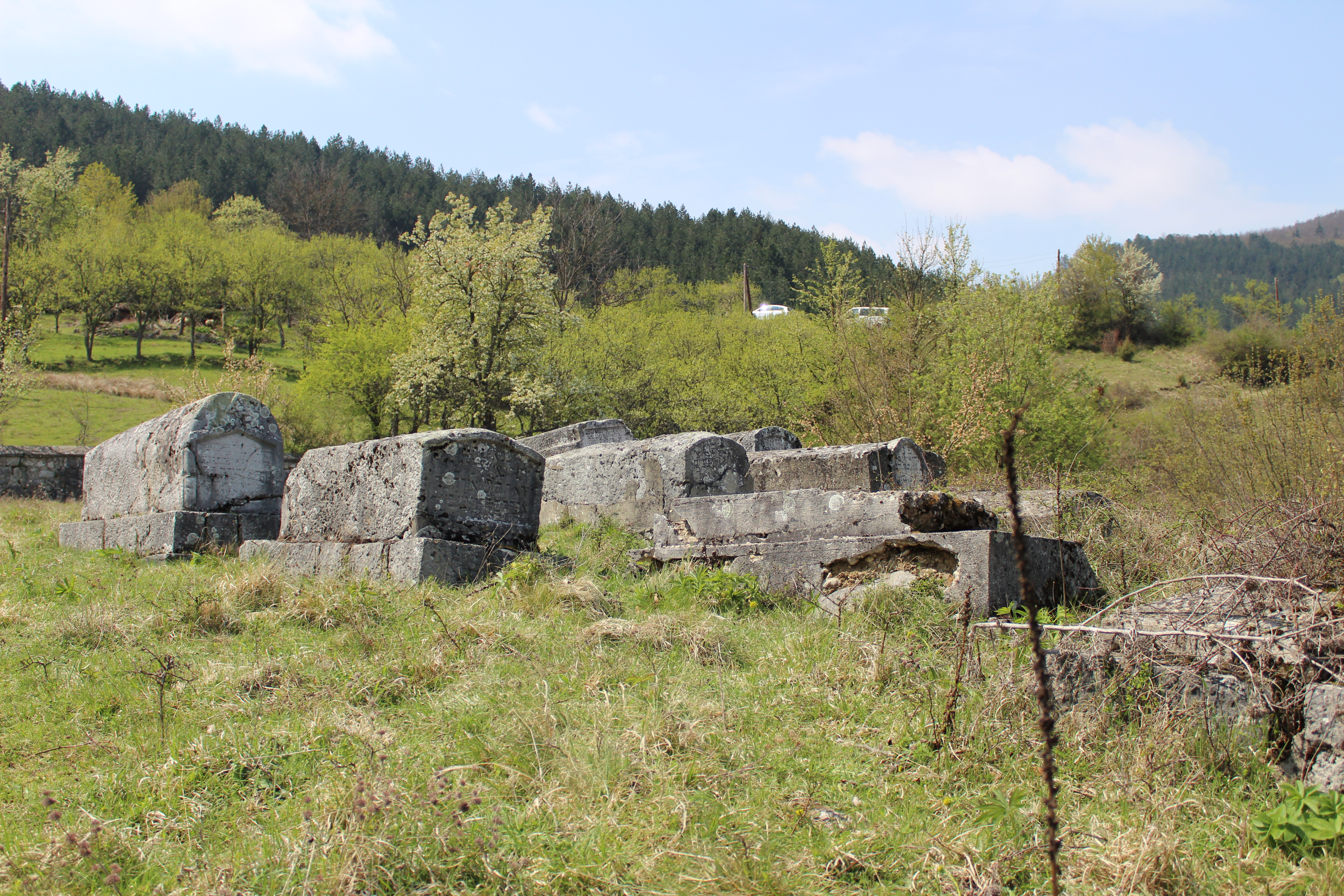
Jewish cemetery in Rogatica

== Prominent Bosnian Jews ==
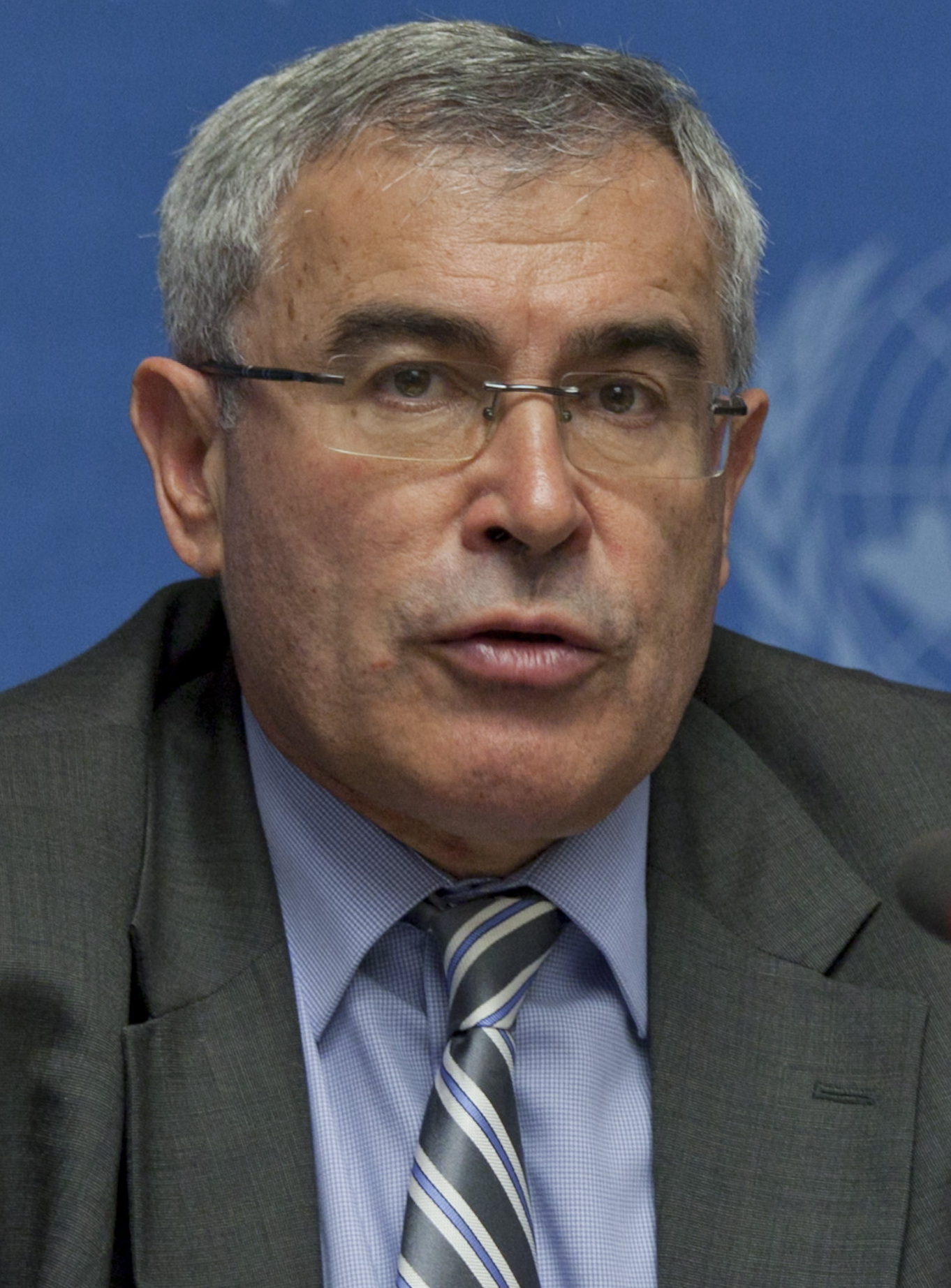
Sven Alkalaj, Minister of Foreign Affairs from 2007 to 2012

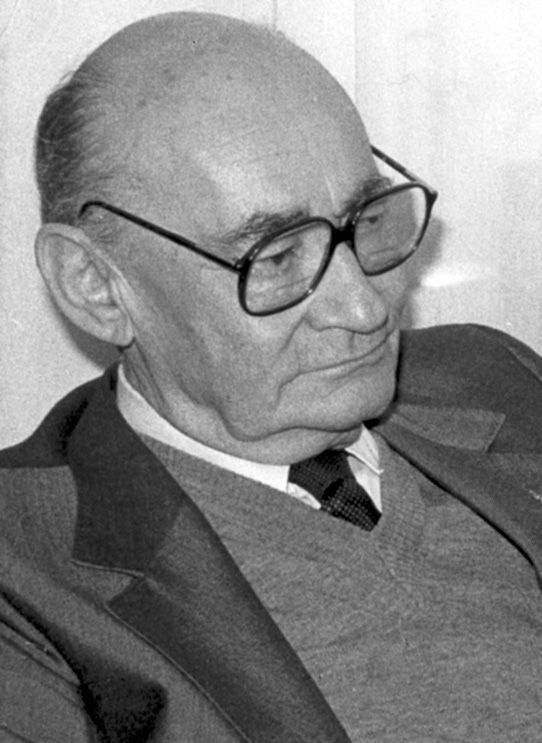
Emerik Blum, mayor of Sarajevo from 1981 to 1983

- Moris Albahari, who passed away in Sarajevo in October 2022 at age 93, was one of the last native speakers of Ladino (Judaeo-Spanish) in Bosnia. A Holocaust survivor, he was renowned for preserving the community's language, history, and culture, having survived the war by joining the Yugoslav Partisans
- Nisim Albahari, Yugoslav Partisan, People's Hero of Yugoslavia and political leader in the Socialist Republic of Bosnia and Herzegovina
- Judah Alkalai, Rabbi
- Sven Alkalaj, diplomat, former minister of foreign affairs
- Zeki Effendi, scholar
- Kalmi Baruh, writer and philosopher
- Emerik Blum, businessman, founder of Energoinvest, former mayor of Sarajevo
- Laura Papo Bohoreta, feminist writer
- Moric Levi, Rabbi
- Ivan Ceresnjes, architect-researcher, former president of the Jewish community of Bosnia and Herzegovina and vice-chairman of the Yugoslav Federation of Jewish Communities from 1992 to 1996
- Oskar Danon, composer and conductor
- Rav Moshe Danon, known as the Rabbi of Stolac
- David Elazar, Israeli general and Chief of Staff of Israel Defense Forces
- Jakob Finci, current spiritual leader of the Bosnian Jewish community.
- Moshe David Gaon (1889-1958), historian, scholar of the Sephardic world, bibliographer, educator, journalist, poet, pioneer of Ladino research.
- Ernest Grin (1899–1976), Academician, professor, medical doctor, member of Bosnia and Herzegovina Academy of Sciences and Arts, laureate of AVNOJ award, WHO expert, founder of several medical establishments in the aftermath of WW2
- Flory Jagoda, American guitarist, composer and singer, known for her interpretations of Ladino songs, including her composition for Hanukkah, Ocho Kandelikas.
- Avraham Levi-Lazzaris (1905–2008), businessman, explorer of the first mines of diamonds in Rondônia, Brazil, Holocaust survivor.
- Moses Levi-Lazzaris (1944–1990), mechanical engineer, Trotskyist militant in Brazil, Holocaust survivor.
- Zoran Mandlbaum (1946–2015), Leader of the Jewish Community in Mostar during the War
- Daniel Ozmo (1912–1942), painter and printmaker
- Roza Papo, military physician and general of the JNA
- Ranko Rihtman, musician, member of the Sarajevo rock band Indexi
- Cvjetko Rihtman, musicologist, folklorist, composer and first director of the Sarajevo Opera in 1946–1947
- Salomon Romano (1919-2006), general of the JNA
- Robert Rothbart, basketball player
- Isak Samokovlija, writer
- Sanda Smital, painter
- Marina Toschich, world-renowned musician and master oud player.
- Hilde Zaloscer (1903–1999), world-renowned art historian, Egyptologist, and Coptologist.
- Marina Finci, painter
- Nehemiah Hayyun, Kabbalist

== See also ==
- La Benevolencija
- History of the Jews in Yugoslavia
- Jewish Museum of Bosnia and Herzegovina
