= Kalmi Baruh =

Bosnian linguist (1896-1945)

PhD. Kalmi Baruh
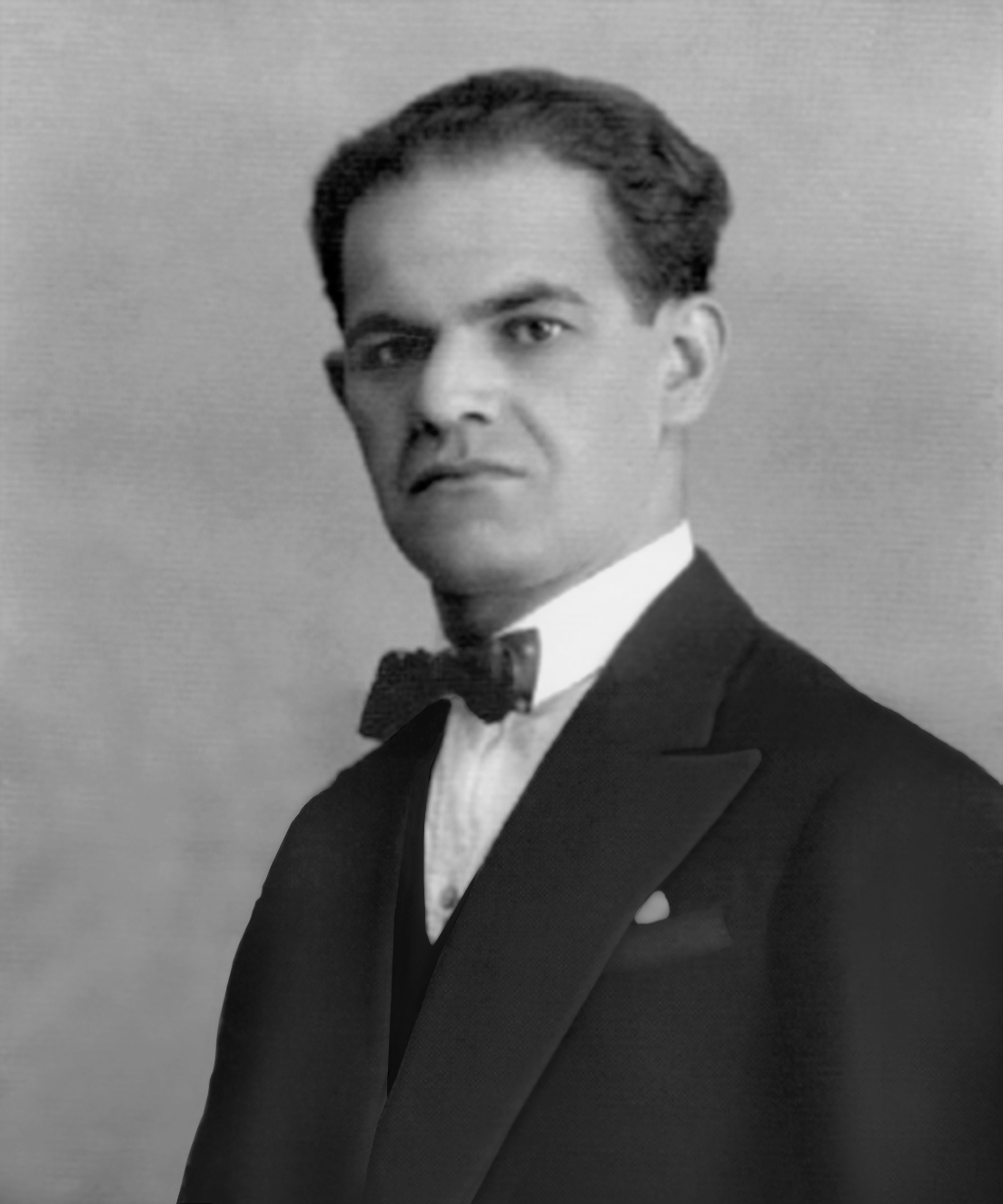
- Born: 26 December 1896; Sarajevo, Ottoman Empire
- Died: 1945 (aged 48–49); Bergen-Belsen, Germany
- Occupation: Linguist

Kalmi Baruh (26 December 1896 – 1945) was a Bosnian scholar in the field of Ladino, pioneer of the Sephardic studies and Hispanic studies in former Kingdom of Yugoslavia.

== Life and activities ==
Kalmi Baruh was born in December 1896 in Sarajevo, in one of the oldest Sephardic families in Bosnia and Herzegovina. He attended elementary school in the town of Višegrad and graduated from high school in Sarajevo. Baruh's academic studies and his PhD thesis Der Lautstand des Judenspanischen in Bosnien (The Sound System of Judeo-Spanish in Bosnia) were at Vienna University.

He worked as a teacher at the First Sarajevan Gymnasium. He was the only Balkan Peninsula scholarship recipient from the Spanish Government for post-doctoral studies in the Spanish Center for Historical Studies in Madrid (1928/9). For a long period of years, he worked together with several Yugoslav and Europe magazines in the field of linguistics and literature, such as: Srpski književni glasnik and Misao, both from Belgrade, Revista de filología Española (Madrid). He collaborated with the Gajret, the Institute for Balkan Studies the University of Belgrade and the Royal Spanish Academy. He translated from Spanish to Serbo-Croatian (Enrique Larreta: Slava don Ramira, Jedan život u doba Filipa II, Narodna prosveta, Belgrade, 1933; Jose Eustasio Rivera: Vrtlog, Minerva, Subotica-Belgrade, 1953 ...).

Baruh presented some of the lesser-known Spanish literature in Yugoslavia and reviewed it. He also published linguistic comparative studies, school books and scientific works on philology reviews, especially in Romance languages. He collected, annotated and explored Judeo-Spanish linguistic forms and romances throughout Bosnia, Priština and Skopje. Baruh was one of the pillars of the Sarajevan progressive magazine Pregled, and a competent basis for the congregational magazines Jevrejski život and Jevrejski glas, as well as for the cultural-educational society La Benevolencija. He cooperated with Ernesto Giménez Caballero, Ivo Andrić, Isidora Sekulić, Žak Konfino, Stanislav Vinaver, Jovan Kršić, Moric Levi, Laura Papo Bohoreta and others.

Baruh spoke ten languages; he wrote his works primarily in Serbo-Croatian, in Ladino, Spanish, French and German.

During the 1930s he was an eminent, left-oriented Yugoslav intellectual. Baruh gave special attention to the pupils of poor social background, workers' education, religious tolerance and fought against antisemitism. He propagated unreserved support for the Republicans during the Spanish Civil War.

He died in the Nazi concentration camp called Bergen-Belsen.

== Works ==
=== Most popular works ===
- Španske romanse bosanskih Jevreja (Spanish Ballads of the Bosnian Jews);
- El Judeo-Español de Bosnia;
- Jevreji na Balkanu i njihov jezik (Jews in the Balkans and their Language);
- Španija u doba Majmonidesovo (Spain in the Era of Maimonides);
- Španija Filipa II (Spain of Philip the Second);
- Španija u književnosti jedne generacije (Spain in One Generation's Literary Fiction);
- Miguel de Unamuno;
- Islamski izvori Danteove Božanske komedije (Islamic Sources of Dante's Divine Comedy).

== Bibliography ==
Comprehensive international bibliographies that deal with Ladino culture and especially with the Judeo-Spanish language include Kalmi Baruh's bibliography. In 1971, Samuel Armistead and Joseph Silverman from the University of Pennsylvania in Philadelphia have translated Baruh's Spanish Ballads [Romances] of the Bosnian Jews to English and provided their own work on this scientific paper. Among others Josip Tabak, Ivo Andrić, Samuel Kamhi, Vojislav Maksimović, Krinka Vidaković Petrov, Muhamed Nezirović, Predrag Palavestra, David Albahari, Dina Katan Ben-Zion, Ana Šomlo, Jennie Lebel, Vedrana Gotovac and Alexander Nikolić have written about Baruh.

=== Separate editions of selected Kalmi Baruh's works ===
- Eseji i članci iz španske književnosti, Svjetlost, Sarajevo, 1956;
- Izabrana djela, Svjetlost, Sarajevo, 1972;
- Selected Works on Sephardic and Other Jewish Topics, Shefer Publishers, Jerusalem, Israel, 2005, ISBN 965-90790-0-1 and 2007 ISBN 978-965-90790-1-8.
