= Ivan Ceresnjes =

Bosnian-Israeli Jewish community leader and architect

Ivan Čerešnješ (born 1945, Sarajevo), also known as Ivica Čerešnješ, is a Bosnian architect-researcher at the Center for Jewish Art at the Hebrew University of Jerusalem specializing in the documentation of the Jewish architectural-cultural heritage in the former Yugoslavia and Eastern Europe. During the Bosnian War of 1992–1995 he served as the president of the Jewish community of Bosnia and Herzegovina, and played a central role in the rescue and evacuation of thousands of Sarajevo residents.

== Biography ==
Čerešnješ was born in Sarajevo, Yugoslavia (present-day Bosnia and Herzegovina). He received his bachelor's and master's degrees from the Arhitektonsko - Urbanisticki Fakultet (Faculty of Urban Architecture) in the University of Sarajevo and afterwards worked as a practicing architect-designer, project manager, and manager of the building department, with responsibility for approximately 500,000 square meters of buildings in the Sarajevo area. His work included designing, building, restoration and conservation of sacred buildings of various religious denominations in Bosnia and Herzegovina, such as churches and mosques.

A significant part of his professional activity was devoted to Jewish buildings and sites. He was engaged in initiating, supporting, organizing the funding, and actively working on revitalization, reconstruction, and conservation of the 16th-century old Sephardic cemetery in Sarajevo. That project was prepared for a public presentation twenty-four hours before war broke out in Bosnia and Herzegovina in March 1992. Čerešnješ also surveyed and planned restorations for the Ashkenazi synagogue in Sarajevo (built in 1902), the 17th-century Il Kal Nuevu Sephardic synagogue, and the cemetery chapel on the Jewish cemetery (1926).

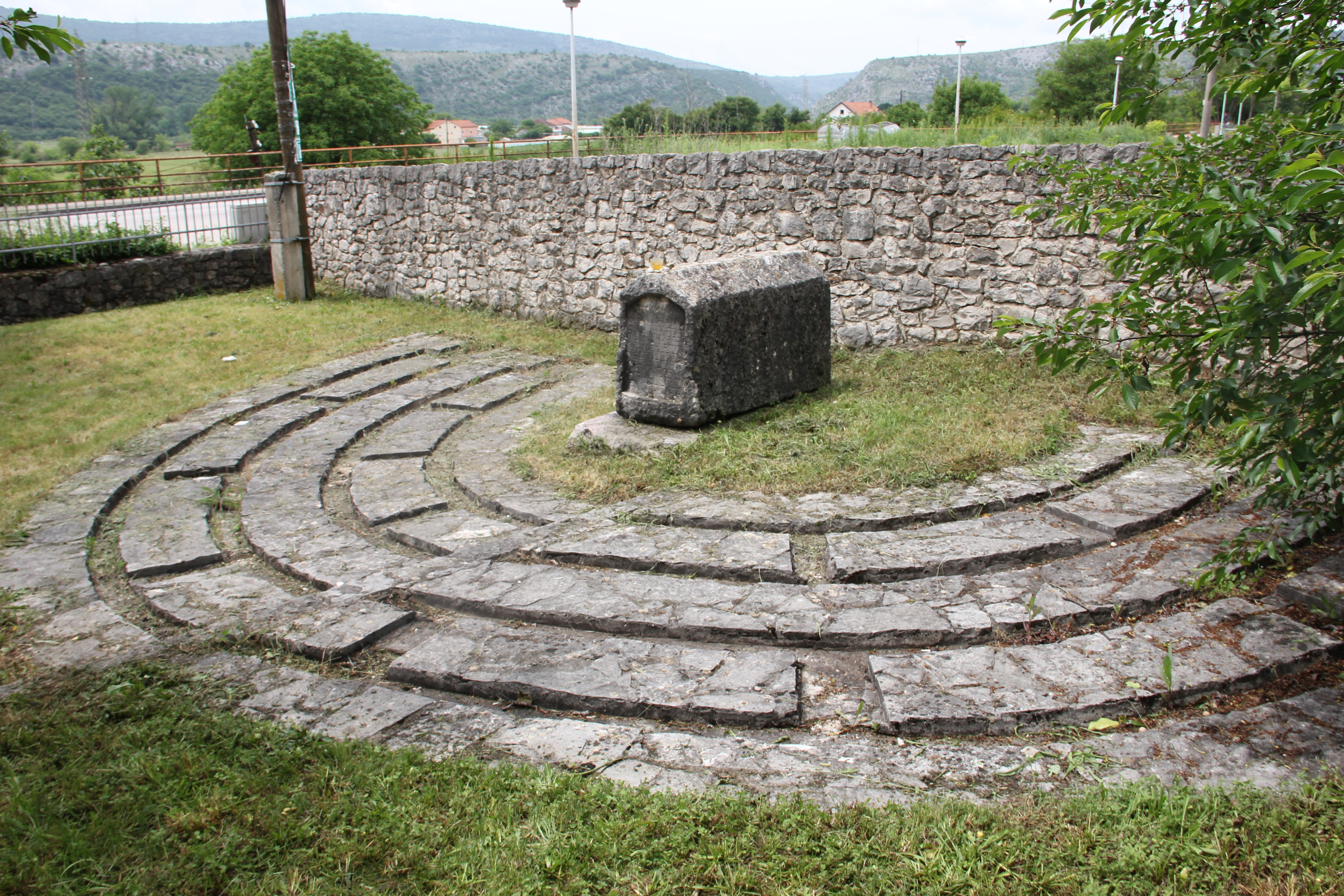
The grave of Rabbi Moshe Danon chief Rabbi of Sarajevo (1815-1830), Located in Stolac, Bosnia and Herzegovina

In 1989–1990 he planned and headed the reconstruction of the Jewish summer camp in Pirovac, Croatia, which served as a central meeting place for the entire Jewish community of the former Yugoslavia. In 1990–1991 he prepared and headed the restoration and conservation of the complex of the burial site of Rabbi Moshe Danon, a significant historic person from the Bosnian Jewish community (1832, The Sarajevo Megilla) in Stolac, Herzegovina.

== Jewish community leader ==
Čerešnješ served as head of the Jewish community of Bosnia and Herzegovina and vice-chairman of the Yugoslav Federation of Jewish Communities from 1992 until his emigration to Israel in 1996. His tenure coincided with the Bosnian War of 1992–1995. When the besieging Serb army occupied the Jewish cemetery in Sarajevo, Ceresnjes gave permission to the Army of the Republic of Bosnia and Herzegovina to bomb the cemetery (in the end, this was necessary).

Čerešnješ and the Sarajevo Jewish humanitarian society, La Benevolencija, also provided aid to thousands of besieged Sarajevo residents, supplying food, medicine, and postal and radio communications. Ceresnjes told a local paper that the nonsectarian relief effort was partly a gesture of gratitude to local Muslims who had hidden Jews during the Nazi occupation of Yugoslavia. As a student of Balkan history, Čerešnješ said he had anticipated the war a full year before it broke out, and had organized the Jewish community of Sarajevo to stockpile supplies, make sure everyone had passports, make plans to evacuate the children and the elderly, and find places for the evacuees in Israel and Europe. After the war started, Ceresnjes and La Benevolencija assisted the American Jewish Joint Distribution Committee in the evacuation of 2,500 Sarajevo residents, only one-third of whom were Jewish. There were 11 evacuations in all, three by air early on in the war, and eight by bus convoy after the airport had been closed to civilian traffic. While other convoys were stopped, the Čerešnješ convoys all got through, as field staff from the Joint negotiated to cease fires to ensure a safe transfer.

In recognition of his wartime humanitarian efforts, Ceresnjes was awarded the French Légion d'honneur in October 1994. He published his wartime memoirs in a 35-page monograph, Caught in the winds of war: Jews in the former Yugoslavia, in 1999.

== Work in Israel ==
Čerešnješ made aliyah to Israel in 1996. In 1997 he joined the Center for Jewish Art at the Hebrew University of Jerusalem as an architect-researcher. He is permanently engaged in the documentation of the Jewish architectural cultural heritage in the former Yugoslavia and other Eastern European countries, along with the mapping of Holocaust memorials and monuments. He also assists the United States Congressional Commission for Protecting and Preserving American Property Abroad, which was founded in 1985 to survey Jewish cemeteries, memorials and monuments, with a primary focus on Eastern Europe.
