= La Benevolencija =

Bosnian Jewish humanitarian organization

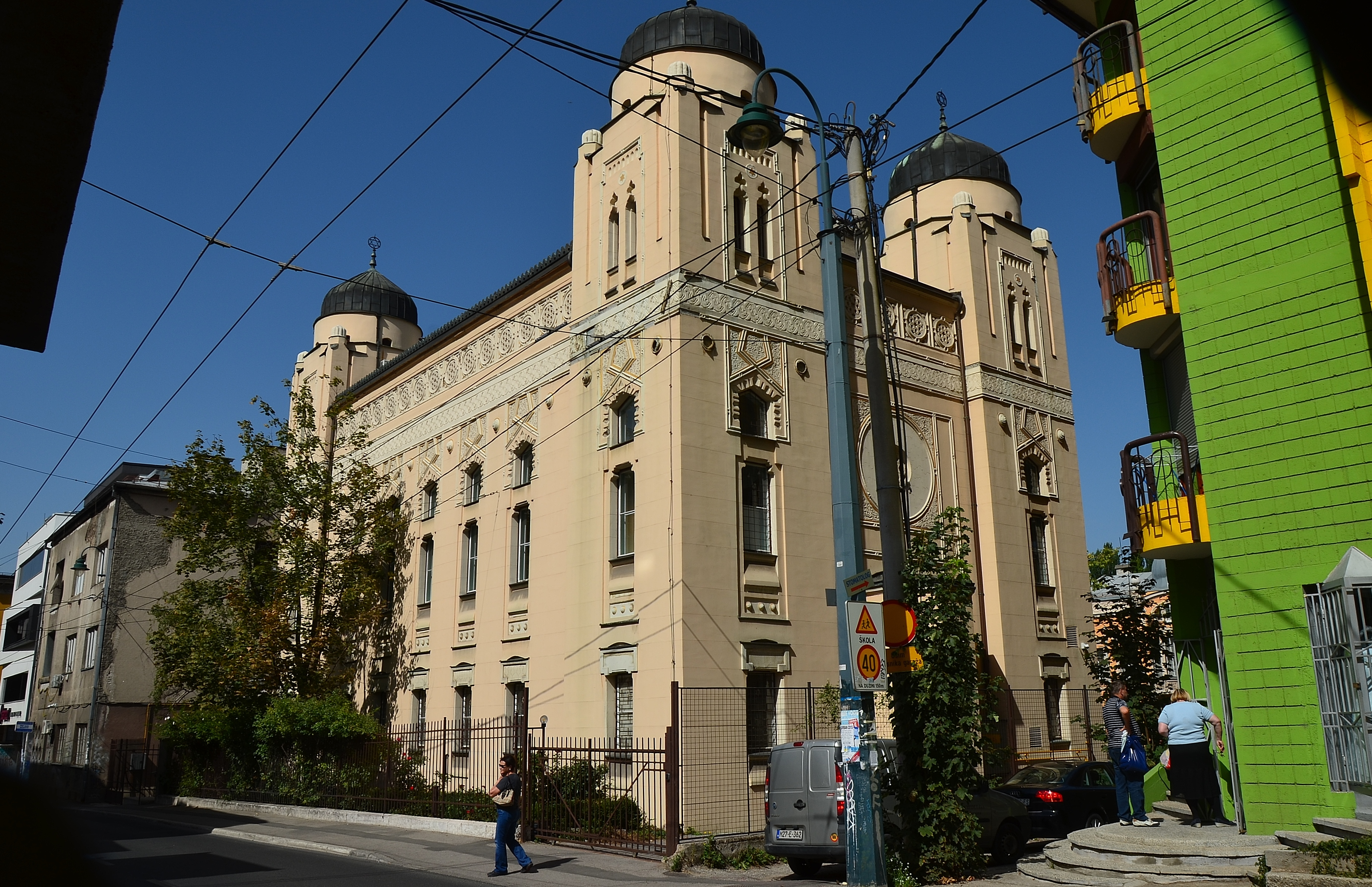
The Sarajevo Synagogue today serves as the seat of La Benevolencija

La Benevolencija is a Jewish cultural-educational and humanitarian organization based in Sarajevo, Bosnia and Herzegovina. During the Siege of Sarajevo in the 1990s, the organization provided medical aid, food rations and educational services for the people trapped in the city.

== History ==
The Jewish Community in Bosnia dates back to the 15th century, when Sephardic Jews escaping the Spanish Inquisition found refuge in the Ottoman-occupied Balkans. The Jewish community thrived in Bosnia, having good relations with the other religious groups in the area.

The history of La Benevolencija, however begins in 1892, after the Austro-Hungarian Empire occupied Bosnia and Herzegovina. The occupation brought with it well-educated Ashkenazi Jews from other parts of the Empire. The original goal of La Benevolencija was to pool funds so that Bosnian Jewish students could attend better universities in other parts of the Empire. Because levels of antisemitism were relatively lower in the Balkans than in other parts of the Empire, many students returned to Sarajevo after their university studies, which helped the long-term growth of the organization. The organization continued to encourage education, opening what would be the largest public library in Sarajevo.

World War II decimated the Jewish community in Sarajevo and Bosnia as a whole. After the creation of the Socialist Federal Republic of Yugoslavia in 1945, religious-based organizations like La Benevolencija were banned. Despite these bans, the community continued similar activities to that of La Benevolencija, however on a more secular scale.

The fall of socialism provided an opportunity for the Jewish community in Bosnia to re-launch the organization. In 1991 La Benevolencija was re-formed, with a mission to "share and celebrate the richness and diversity of Bosnian-Jewish culture" with the rest of the community. 1992 brought with it both celebration and tragedy. The organization was able to celebrate its 100th anniversary, but regional conflicts were beginning to reach Bosnia.

=== During the War ===
Even before the conflict began in earnest in Bosnia, La Benevolencija prepared for the worst. Upon hearing that elderly patients in Dubrovnik were unable to access medication because of the War in Croatia, the organization began stockpiling medication and food with a long shelf-life. When shelling of the city began in May 1992, many people in the city sought shelter in the city's synagogue as people were afraid and had nowhere else to go.

The Jewish community in Bosnia was benefited by two different situations. First, they were able to use their neutral status to protect people from all the other ethnic groups in the city. Additionally, they benefited logistically. While many of the other humanitarian aid organizations had their supplies outside of the city and were unable to bring them past the siege, La Benevolencija used the gymnasium of the Synagogue to store supplies, thereby making it one of the few places where food and supplies could be found after all the stores had been looted.

During the Siege, the organization had many roles. La Benevolencija opened three pharmacies in the city. A clinic was opened in the Jewish Community Center to treat the sick and injured. A non-denominational soup kitchen was organized, which provided 320 meals a day, 7 days a week. The organization provided educational and cultural programs for citizens trapped by the siege, teaching language courses, holding exhibitions for journalists at the Sarajevo Holiday Inn, and organizing the Miss Sarajevo pageant. When phone lines and postal service was cut, the organization set up a two-way radio link for people to keep in contact with the outside world, and worked with international journalists to receive and distribute letters.

This was not merely a Jewish effort, however. People from across the community offered their support and expertise to the organization during the siege, regardless of their ethnic or religious background.

As the siege dragged on, the organization worked with the American Jewish Joint Distribution Committee to allow convoys of civilians to escape the city and travel to peaceful territory. Jakob Finci, one of the leaders of La Benevolencija, helped forge the travel documents of Serbs, Croats and Muslims in the city so they would be listed as Jews on their travel documents and therefore escape the city safely. In the end, La Benevolencija helped over 2000 people escape Sarajevo during the Siege.

== La Benevolencija today ==
After the war, the organization slowly ended its humanitarian work; closing down its pharmacies, ending the soup kitchen and shifting its education programs to job training programs. Working with the World Bank, the UNHCR and the US Government, the organization developed a microcredit program that offered loans up to 10000 Bosnian convertible marks to small businesses. As of 2012, this microcredit program had a 97% repayment rate.

The Organization also provides home care services to the elderly in Bosnia. With the help of the JDC, the organization provides care for 100-400 people two to three times a week, operating not only in Sarajevo, but in Mostar, Zenica, Doboj, Banja Luka and Tuzla.

== Radio La Benevolencija Humanitarian Tools Foundation ==
In 2002, inspired by La Benevolencija, a group media professionals in the Netherlands founded the NGO Radio La Benevolencija Humanitarian Tools Foundation (RLB), an organisation producing the radio soap Musekeweya, as well as documentaries and educational programmes in Rwanda, the Democratic Republic of Congo and Burundi for the empowerment of people who are the targets of hate violence.
