= Hilde Zaloscer =

Art Historian, Egyptologyst, Coptologyst (1903–1999)

Hildegard Zaloscer (Zaloszer) (15 June 1903 – 20 December 1999) was an art historian, Egyptologist, Coptologist, essayist, novelist and a prominent expert of Coptic history and art.

== Biography ==
Zaloscer was born in Tuzla, Bosnia Herzegovina (then Austria-Hungary), the eldest daughter of the affluent Austrian-Jewish lawyer and state-official Dr. Jacob and his wife Bertha (née Kallach). Since her father was a state official and a known Austrian monarchist, the family had to flee to Vienna when the Austrian monarchy collapsed, at the end of the First World War (1918). Her family settled in Vienna, where she finished her secondary education and studied art history and prehistory at the Vienna University (Ph.D. 1926, her dissertation being "Die frühmittelalterliche Dreistreifenornamentik der Mittelmeerrandgebiete mit besonderer Berücksichtigung der Denkmäler am Balkan").

From 1927 to 1936, Zaloscer was the editor of the art magazine Belvedere, and corresponded with Thomas Mann. Due to the rise of anti-Semitism in Vienna she emigrated to Egypt in 1936. According to an article penned by author Judith Belfkih for the Wiener Zeitung, the Jewish Museum Vienna determined that Zaloscer was one of at least 13 women who undertook "fictitious marriages" to escape Nazi persecution through emigration during World War II:

What almost unites them all: the women were silent for a long time about their fictitious marriages and the resulting double lives - to protect the children or the later partners. The motivation of the women was clear: they fought for survival and deliberately accepted the many risks - from denunciation of extortion and sexual assault - to their safety.... The biographies traced in the exhibition certainly convey the image of extremely self-confident and equally courageous women - by the political activist and writer Hilda Monte, the later doctor Rosl Ebner or the art historian Hilde Zaloscer, who was professionally married to Egyptian exile.

Between 1946 and 1968, Zaloscer was a professor of art history at the University of Alexandria where she became a prominent and world-renowned expert on Coptic art.

After the Six Day War (1967), she was expelled from Egypt since she was Jewish. She lived temporarily in Vienna from 1968 to 1970 and, in the following two years, Zaloscer was a professor at the Carleton University in Ottawa, Ontario, Canada, before returning to Vienna.

From 1975 to 1978, she was a lecturer at the University of Vienna. Zaloscer was a prolific essayist and writer and among others was an editor of the Encyclopedia Coptica.

== Awards and honors ==
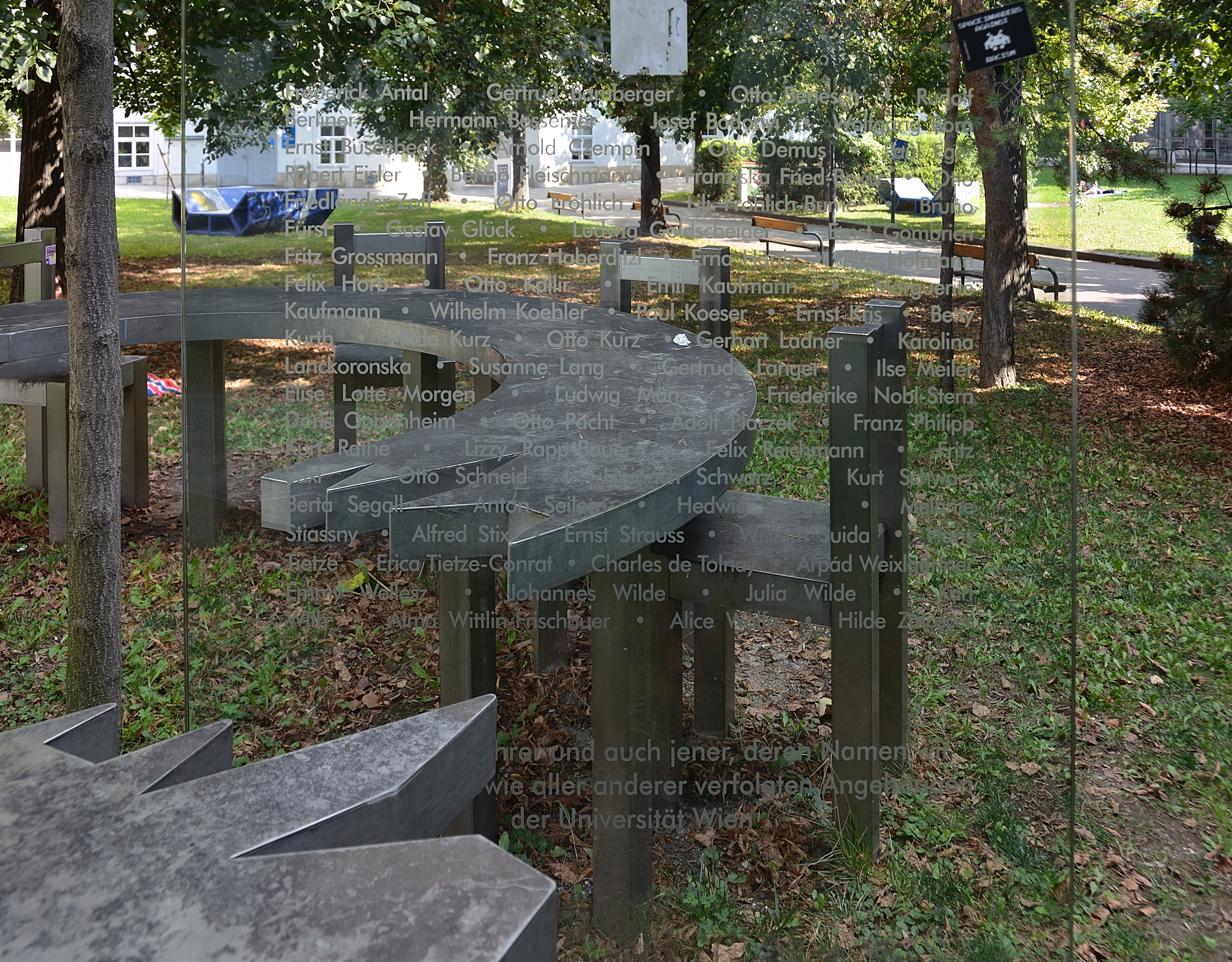
Hilde Zaloscer's name (bottom right) on the monument to victims of the Kunsthistorisches Institut, University of Vienna.

- Theodor-Körner Prize (Austria)
- Adolf-Schärf Prize
- The Golden Honorary Doctorate of the Vienna University
- Goldenes Verdienstkreuz des Landes Wien
- Kulturmedaille der Stadt Linz

== Publications ==
- Zaloscer, Hilde (1991). Zur Genese der koptischen Kunst: ikonographische Beiträge (On the genesis of Coptic art: iconographic contributions). Böhlau Verlag. ISBN 3205053982 – via Google Books.
- Zaloscer, Hilde (1985). Der Schrei, signum einer epoche: das expressionistische jahrhundert : bildende kunst, lyrik und prosa, theater (The cry, sign of an epoch : the expressionist century: fine art, poetry and prose, theater) (in German). Edition Brandstätter. ISBN 3854471041.
- Zaloscer, Hilde (1969). Vom Mumienbildnis zur Ikone (From the mummy portrait to the icon) (in German). Harrassowitz – via Google Books.
- Zaloscer, Hilde (1954). Survivance et migration – via Google Books.
- Zaloscer, Hilde Visuelle Beschwörung, autonomes Kunstwerk, Ideograph 1997
- Zaloscer, Hilde Wissenschaftliche Arbeit ohne wissenschaftlichen Apparat 2004
- Zaloscer, Hilde Zu ägyptischen Totenmasken 1999
- Zaloscer, Hilde Ägyptische Textilkunst 1993
- Zaloscer, Hilde Ägyptische Wirkereien 1962
- Zaloscer, Hilde Die Antithetik im Werke Thomas Manns 1959
- Zaloscer, Hilde Das dreimalige Exil 2004
- Zaloscer, Hilde Eine Heimkehr gibt es nicht 1988
- Zaloscer, Hilde La Femme au voile dans l’iconographie copte 1955
- Zaloscer, Hilde Die frühmittelalterliche Dreistreifornamentik der Mittelmeerrandgebiete mit besonderer Berücksichtigung der Denkmäler am Balkan 1926
- Zaloscer, Hilde Le Greco 1946
- Zaloscer, Hilde Die Kunst im christlichen Ägypten 1974
- Zaloscer, Hilde Kunstgeschichte und Nationalsozialismus 2004
- Zaloscer, Hilde Porträts aus dem Wüstensand 1961
- Zaloscer, Hilde Le "Doctor Faustus" de Thomas Mann et ses modèles 1953
- Zaloscer, Hilde De la composition musicale dans les oeuvres littéraires 1953
- Zaloscer, Hilde Quelques considérations sur les rapports entre l’art copte et les Indes 1947
