= Jakob Finci =

Bosnian Jewish community leader and diplomat

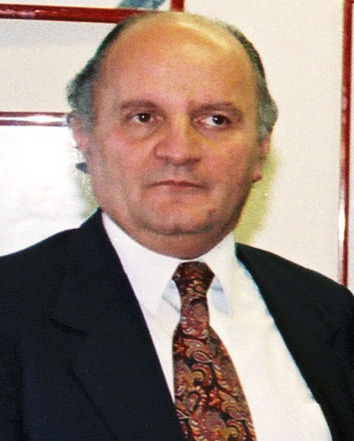
Finci in 1998

Jakob Finci (born 1 October 1943) is a prominent Bosnian politician and ambassador, the current president of the Jewish Community of Bosnia and Herzegovina.

== Early life ==
Finci was born to a Sephardic Jewish family on 1 October 1943 in the WWII-era Rab concentration camp.

== Career ==
A lawyer by profession, Finci became member of the Presidency of the Jewish Community in Sarajevo in 1990, and in this capacity worked on humanitarian activities during the war in Sarajevo. In August 1995, Finci was elected president of the Jewish Community of Bosnia and Herzegovina. Finci is a founding member - and current president - of the Inter-Religious Council of Bosnia and Herzegovina, which was established in 1997. Its membership reflects the country's Islamic, Christian, and Jewish communities.

Finci was also president of the Constitutional Commission of the Federation of Bosnia and Herzegovina, director of the Civil Service Agency of Bosnia and Herzegovina, as well as ambassador to Switzerland and non-resident ambassador to Liechtenstein.

As a respected public figure, Finci was elected in 2000 to chair the national committee charged with the establishment of a truth and reconciliation commission. Two years later, he was appointed Director of the Civil Service Agency of Bosnia and Herzegovina. However, his political ambitions were thwarted when he learned that, being Jewish, he was unable to run for president.

== Sejdić and Finci v. Bosnia and Herzegovina ==
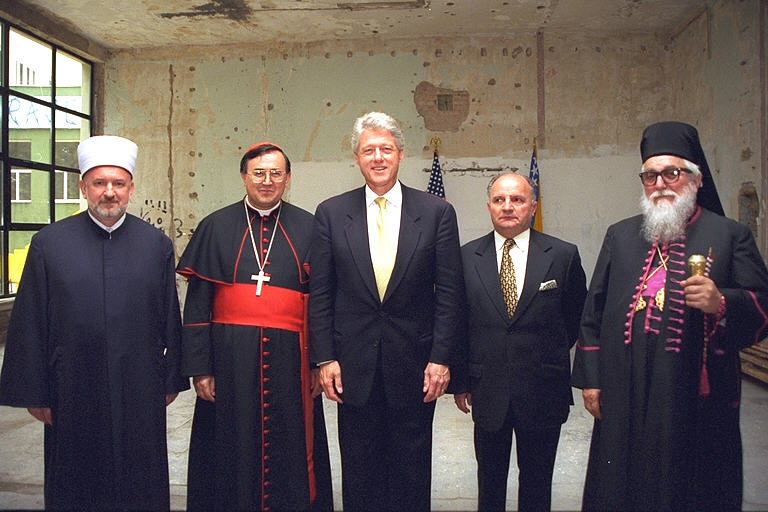
Finci alongside U.S. President Bill Clinton and representatives of the other religious communities in Bosnia and Herzegovina, 30 July 1999

Under the Dayton peace agreement that ended the war in Bosnia on 14 December 1995, membership to the parliament's upper house or presidency is reserved for one of the three ethnic groups: Bosniaks, Croats and Serbs. Minorities, or "others" outside these constituent groups, such as Jews and Roma, can be Members of Parliament, but may not stand for higher political office. Jakob Finci and Dervo Sejdić, a prominent Bosnian Roma and member of Bosnia's Roma Council, appealed to the European Court of Human Rights, arguing that Bosnia's Constitution violates the European Convention on Human Rights. The judgement was handed down in their favor in September 2009. The Court found that certain provisions of the Bosnian constitution and election law discriminate against minority groups. However, six years after the ruling, the judgement has not been implemented yet by Bosnia and Herzegovina.

== Honors and awards ==
For his work, Jakob Finci has been decorated several times. These honors include the Grand Cross of the Order of Merit of the Federal Republic of Germany as well as the American decoration First American Freedom in Richmond Virginia. He has also been named Chevalier de la Légion d'Honneur of the French Republic, and in 2009. he was proclaimed person of the year by Sarajevo's daily newspaper SAN, and man of the year for 2013 by the Bosnian daily Večernji list. Jakob Finci received International Primo Levi Prize in 2013 in Genoa, Italy.
