= Arie Livne Jewish Cultural Center =

Cultural center in town of Banja Luka

Arie Livne Jewish cultural center
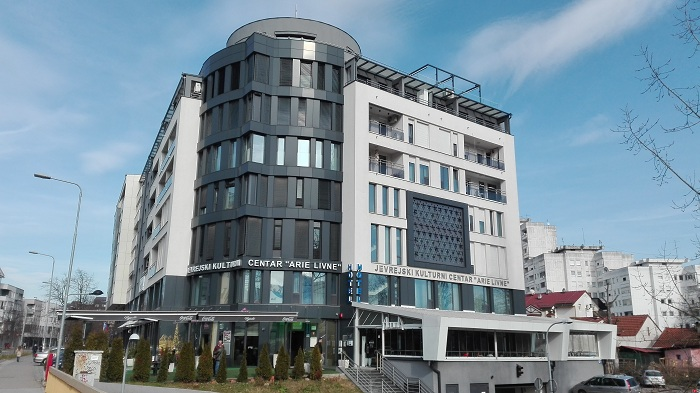

- Location of the cultural center in Bosnia and Herzegovina
- Established: 2014
- Location: Banja Luka, Bosnia and Herzegovina
- Coordinates: 44°46′04″N 17°11′58″E
- Type: Jewish museum

The Arie Livne Jewish cultural center is a cultural center in the town of Banja Luka in Bosnia and Herzegovina. Inaugurated in 2014, it is the only such facility built after the Second World War in the Balkans. The cultural center is used for the affirmation of Jewish culture, history and tradition. It includes a religious centre - the Ilona Weiss synagogue - as well as shops, coffee bars, and private spaces.

== Overview ==
The synagogue is part of the Jewish cultural centre is named after the mother of Arie Livne, Ilona Weiss, who during World War II was murdered in Auschwitz. This is one of the two synagogues in the territory of the Republic of Srpska, the other being located in Doboj.

The first Days of Israel and Jewish culture were organised at the Arie Livne Jewish cultural center in 2015.

The Jewish cultural center is named after Arie Livne, friend of Republika Srpska's President Milorad Dodik, who named him as Representative of Republika Srpska in Israel. In 2017 it was revealed that the office is registered as a private company in Israel, despite having received nearly one million Bosnian Marks in public subsidies. Livne was later declared as persona non grata in Israel, and Dodik threatened to cut off all relations between Republika Srpska and Israel because of this.
