= Dabravine =

Village in Vareš, Bosnia and Herzegovina

- Village
- Location within Bosnia and Herzegovina
- Coordinates: 44.05442°N 18.2893799°E
- Country: Bosnia and Herzegovina
- Entity: Federation of Bosnia and Herzegovina
- Canton: Zenica-Doboj
- Municipality: Vareš

Area
  - Total: 0.44 sq mi (1.13 km^{2})

Population (2013)
  - Total: 326
  - Density: 747/sq mi (288/km^{2})
- Time zone: UTC+1 (CET)
  - Summer (DST): UTC+2 (CEST)

Dabravine is a village in the municipality of Vareš, Bosnia and Herzegovina.

During the Second World War, partisan forces attacked fascist forces in the village on the night of the 16th and 17th of January 1942. The partisans were initially successful but withdrew when an armored train arrived.

== Demographics ==
According to the 2013 census, its population was 326.

Ethnicity in 2013
Ethnicity	Number	Percentage
Bosniaks	318	97.5%
Croats	2	0.6%
Serbs	1	0.3%
other/undeclared	5	1.5%
Total	326	100%
