= Moric Levi =

Bosnian rabbi (1878–1941)

Rabbi Moric Levi
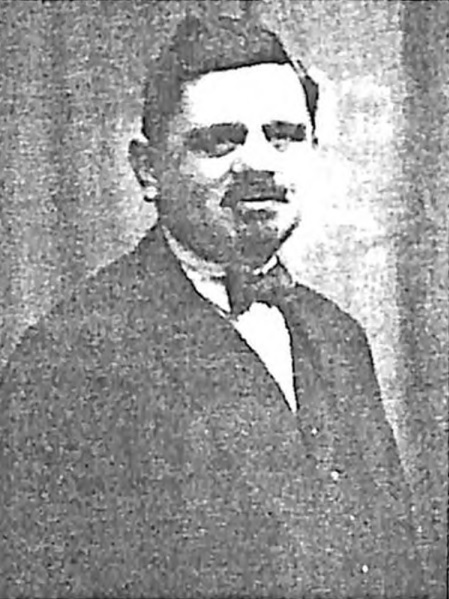
- Born: 27 February 1878; Sarajevo, Ottoman Empire
- Died: 1942 (aged 63–64); Graz, Nazi Germany
- Occupations: Rabbi; scholar; historian
- Known for: Die Sephardim in Bosnien (1911)

Moric Levi (27 February 1878 – 1942), was a Bosnian rabbi and historian, who studied Bosnian Jewish history. He was also principal of the Theological Seminary in Sarajevo

== Biography ==
He was born in Sarajevo 1878. In hometown, he finished meldar (Jewish elementary school), la alahu (Bible and Talmud school), and then high school. In 1901, in Vienna, he enrolled in two faculties (Theological and Philosophical), where he graduated in a few years. Immediately after completing his studies, he returned to Sarajevo. In 1916. Sephardic municipality hired him as a rabbi. Among the Sephardic Jews in Bosnia and Herzegovina, Moric Levi was the first educated rabbi. He spoke Bosnian, Greek, Latin, German, Turkish, Arabic, French, and Hebrew language.

In addition to his duties as a rabbi, Moric Levi was also a permanent professor of religious studies in Sarajevo gymnasiums and other secondary schools. From 1928 to 1941, he was also the principal of the Theological Seminary in Sarajevo. The curriculum for the Theological Seminary was compiled by Moric Levi. This was unanimously accepted and approved by the Main Board of the Union of Jewish Municipalities of Yugoslavia.

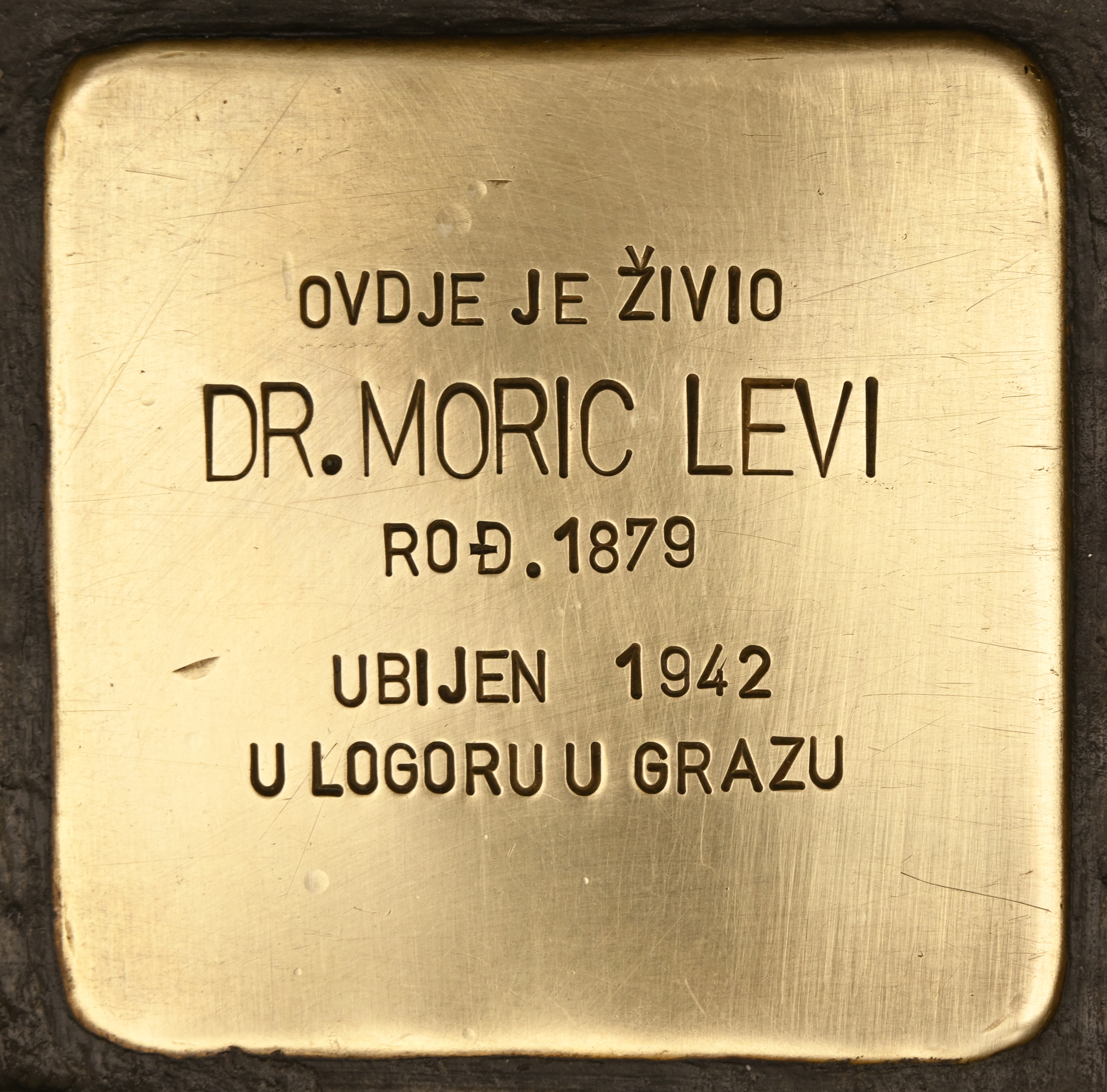
Stumbling block for Moric Levi in Sarajevo

He is known as the author of many scientific treatises and historical articles published between the two world wars in Sarajevo's Jewish newspapers, in rabbinical almanacs, in yearbooks, calendars and memorials.

After the Germans occupied Sarajevo, Levi was taken to a camp in Graz. He was severely tortured there, where he died blinded in 1942.

== Works ==
What Zeki Effendi failed to finish, Moric Levi did with his research. His most important work is "Die Sephardim in Bosnien" (The Sephardim in Bosnia). He wrote this book as a contribution to the knowledge of the history of the Jews in the Balkans. It was published by the Daniel A. Kajon Printing House in Sarajevo in 1911. The information provided by Levi in the book is valuable, as it is based on entries made in the municipal Pinkes from 1720, and illustrates the circumstances and events of the Jewish Municipality of Sarajevo over a full 200 years, with information about rabbis, the founding of the Jewish community, statutes, the construction of a synagogue, costumes, the cultural, political and legal position of Jews and their relationship to the authorities during the Ottoman Empire. The book contains valuable information about trade and economic ties, prominent Jewish public figures of the time, along with valuable contributions and material about Jewish pharmacies and doctors. Thanks to book, after the Holocaust, when all Jewish archives, libraries and documentation were destroyed, material on the past of Bosnia Jewish is being compiled based on this book.

Political offices
Preceded by Merkado Avram J. Romano; Moše Maestro; Jošua Salom	Sarajevo Chief Sephardic Rabbi; 1916–1942	Succeeded by Menahem Romano
Preceded by -	Principal of the Theological Seminary in Sarajevo; 1928–1941	Succeeded by -
