= Sarajevo Synagogue =

Orthodox synagogue in Sarajevo, Bosnia and Herzegovina

- Bosnian: Синагога у Сарајеву, romanized: Sinagoga u Sarajevu
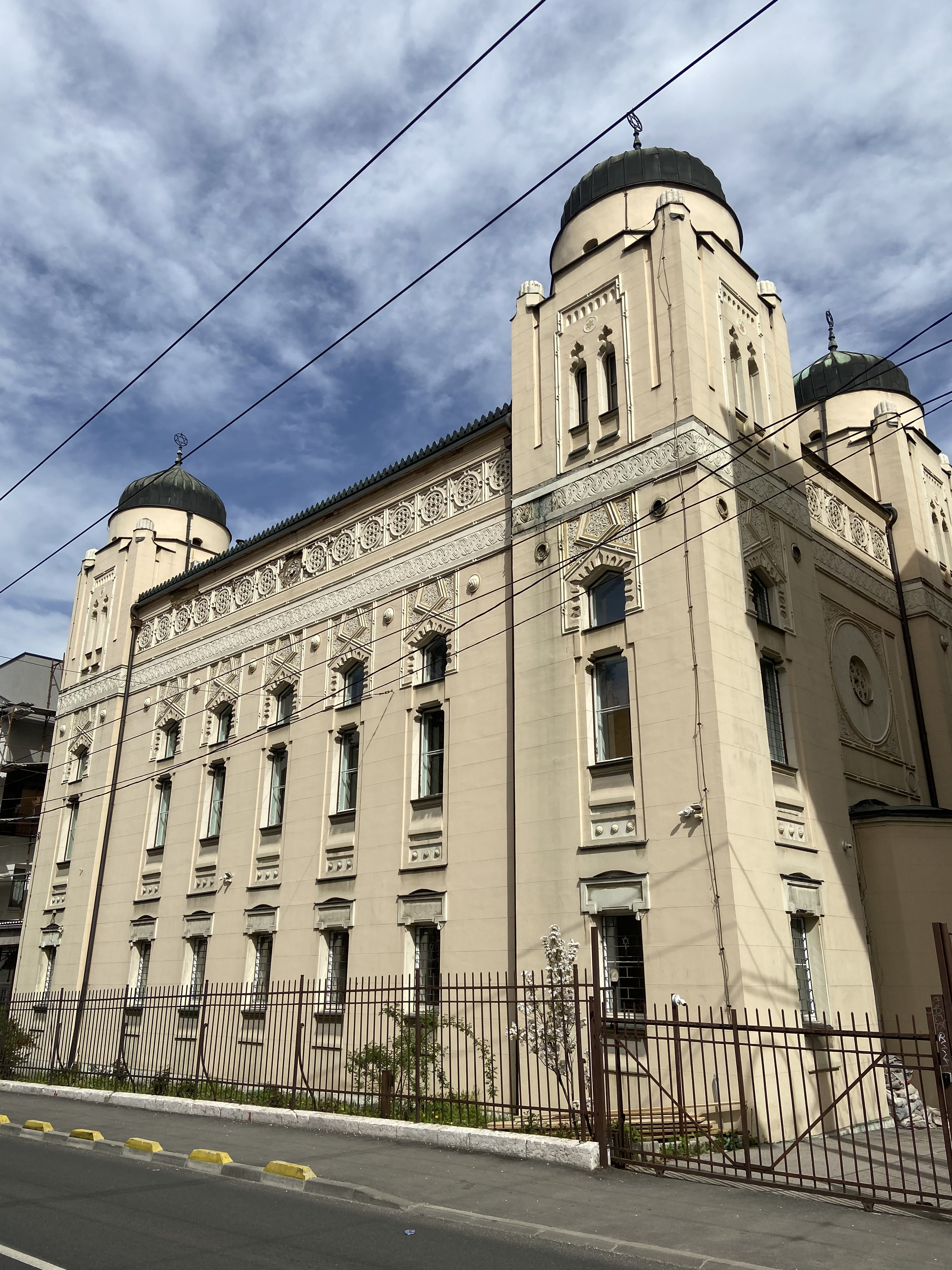
- The synagogue in 2022

- Location of the synagogue in Bosnia and Herzegovina

Religion
- Affiliation: Orthodox Judaism
- Rite: Nusach Ashkenaz
- Ecclesiastical or organizational status: Synagogue
- Status: Active

Location
- Location: Hamdije Kreševljakovića, 59 Quartier de Drvenjia, Sarajevo
- Country: Bosnia and Herzegovina
- Interactive map of Sarajevo Synagogue
- Coordinates: 43°51′23″N 18°25′30″E

Architecture
- Architect: Karel Pařík
- Type: Synagogue architecture
- Style: Moorish Revival
- Established: Late 19th-century
- Completed: 1902
- Dome: 4

KONS of Bosnia and Herzegovina
- Official name: Ashkenazi synagogue, the historic monument
- Type: Category II cultural property
- Criteria: A, C iii.iv.v., D iii.iv., E i.ii.iii.iv.v, G iii.vi., H i.ii.
- Designated: July 6, 2006 (decision No. 07.1-2-126/06-4)
- Reference no.: 2844
- List of National Monuments of Bosnia and Herzegovina

The Sarajevo Synagogue (Serbo-Croatian: Sinagoga u Sarajevu, Синагога у Сарајеву) is an Orthodox Jewish congregation and synagogue, located on the south bank of the river Miljacka, in Sarajevo, in Bosnia and Herzegovina. The synagogue was constructed in 1902 and is the only functioning synagogue in Sarajevo today. The congregation worships in the Ashkenazi rite.

== History ==
The history of the Jews in Sarajevo dates back over 400 years to 1541 when the first Jewish settlers arrived via Salonika. These early settlers were primarily artisans, merchants, pharmacists, and doctors. In 1577, with permission from Pasha Siavush, they established their own quarter, known as El Cortijo (the courtyard). In 1580, the community, with the assistance of a Turkish benefactor, built a synagogue in El Cortijo within a building called Velika Avlija. By the end of the 16th century, the structure housing Velika Avlija became known as the Old Jewish Cathedral, Sarajevo's first synagogue. The building burned down in both 1679 and 1778, and was rebuilt each time. It served as a museum but has since been reconsecrated for services. Next door is the New Synagogue (Novi Hram) serving as an art gallery owned by the Jewish community of Sarajevo.

Ashkenazi Jews began arriving in Sarajevo after the Austro-Hungarian Empire occupied Bosnia in 1878. By the following year, enough Ashkenazim had arrived to form an association; the first Ashkenazi rabbi for the Bosnian community was Bernhard Buchwald. Land was purchased in 1893 with the help of H. Levi. They began plans to construct their own synagogue in 1895, with the original draft made by the Austrian Jewish architect Wilhelm Stiassny, who had designed synagogues in Vienna and Prague. Stiassny promoted the Moorish Revival style but his proposal was rejected by the provincial government. Ultimately, the changes he made at the request of the provincial government were incorporated in the final design by Czech architect Karel Pařík. The actual work was carried out by the contractor Ludwig Jungwirth, and the interior decoration, including the friezes with rosettes and relief ornaments, was done by Ludwig Oisner. In 1902, the 4-storey synagogue was dedicated; the Ashkenazi population at this time was approximately 1,400 people.

The Sephardic community constructed their own Il Kal Grande synagogue of 1932, acknowledged as the largest and most ornate synagogues in the Balkans. It was devastated by the Nazis in 1941 during World War II, but the Ashkenazi synagogue was able to escape total destruction. The Germans used the synagogue as a stable. The Torah ark and the decoration in the lower part of the synagogue was destroyed.

The Holocaust in the 1940s and the civil war during the 1990s left fewer than 5,700 Jews in former Yugoslavia. The Jewish community, like the entire country, was once defined by its unique combination of eastern and western traditions. Populations of Sephardi and Ashkenazi Jews peacefully co-existed with their Christian and Muslim neighbors in Sarajevo and elsewhere in Bosnia and Herzegovina.

In 1964, for the celebration of the 400th anniversary of the arrival of the Jews in Bosnia and Herzegovina, the main prayer room was moved to the upper level, previously the women's galleries. A floor was installed to cover the surface of the room, and the ground floor is now used for celebratory and social events such as weddings and bar and bat mitzvahs.

== Architecture ==
The synagogue was designed in the Moorish Revival style.

The synagogue has enormous arches with richly painted decorations. The high, ornate ceiling was highlighted by a ten-pointed star. At the entrance, a stone menorah commemorates the 400-year anniversary of the Jews in Bosnia and Herzegovina.

The building was renovated in the 2000s.

== Gallery ==
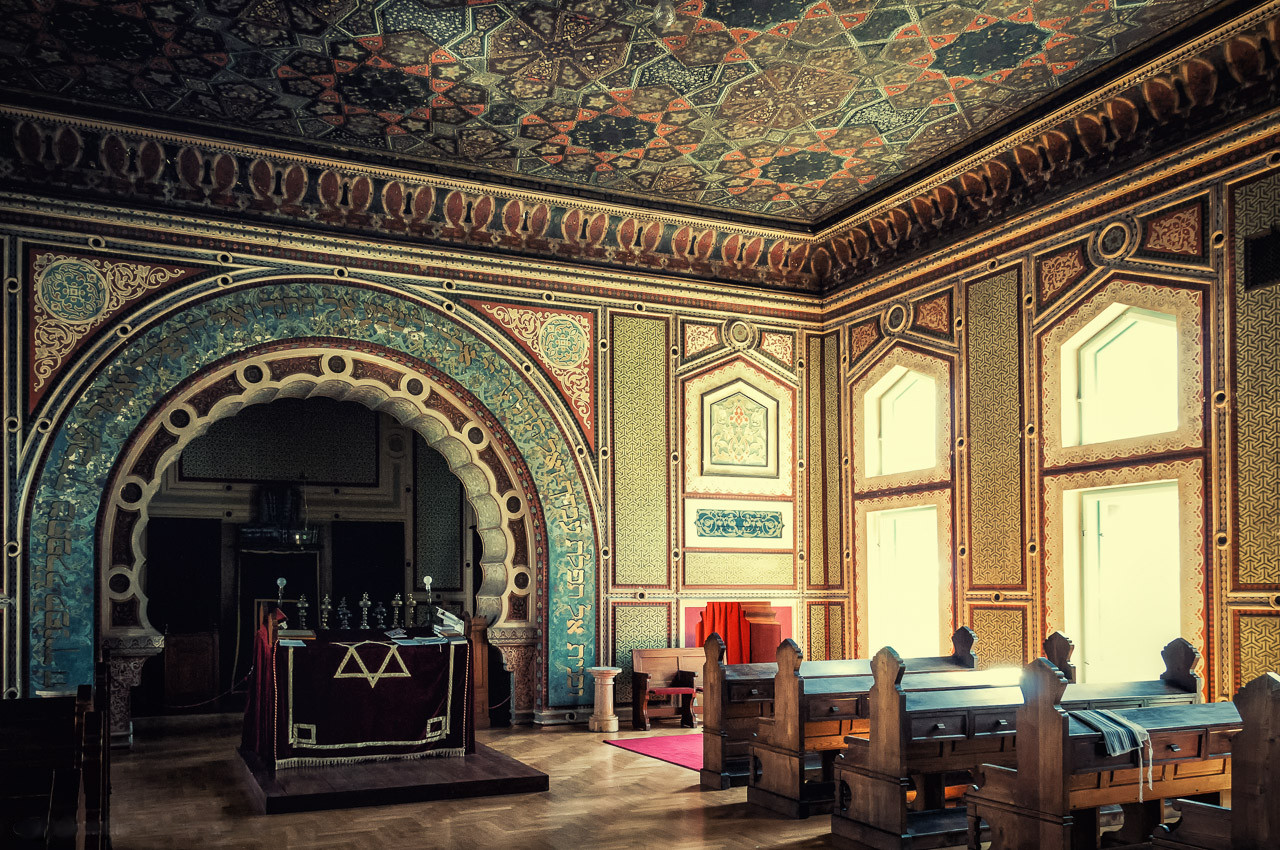
Interior view

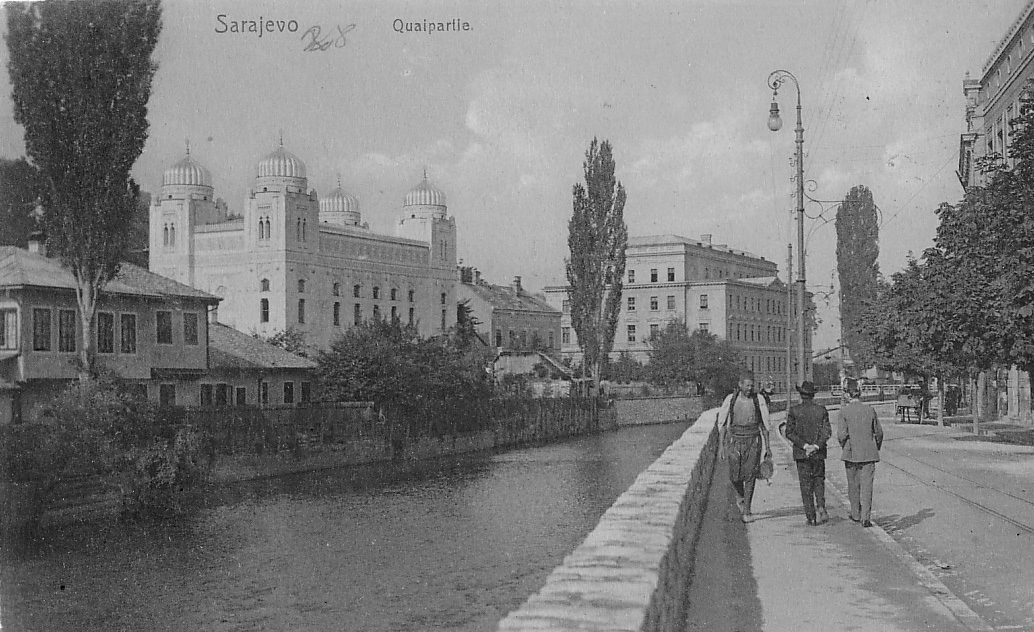
The synagogue in 1914 on the banks of the Miljacka

== See also ==
- Jews in Bosnia and Herzegovina
- Sarajevo Haggadah
- Il Kal Grande, Sephardi synagogue of Sarajevo
