= Moše Rafael Attias =

Bosnian scholar (1845–1916)

Effendi Moše Rafael Attias
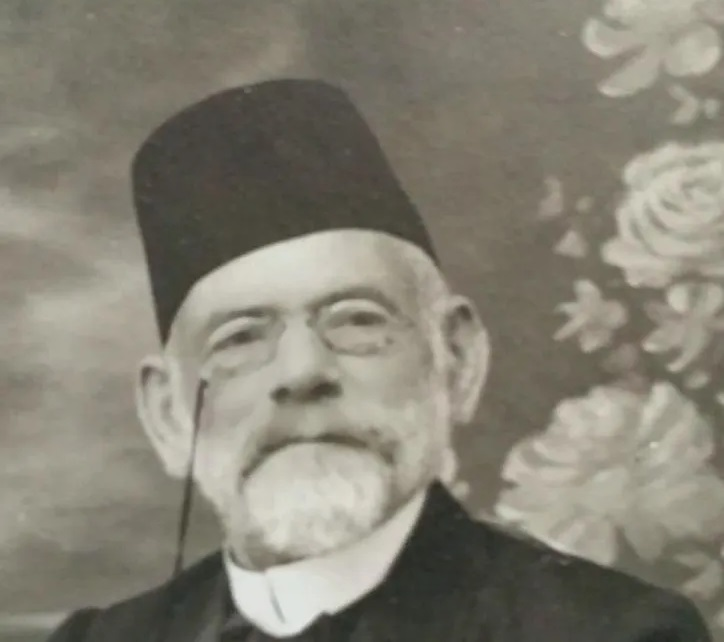
- Born: 1845; Sarajevo, Ottoman Empire
- Died: 2 July 1916 (aged 70–71); Sarajevo, Austria-Hungary
- Resting place: Old Jewish Cemetery, Sarajevo
- Other names: Zeki Effendi, Moše Rafaelović
- Occupations: Journalist; historian; poet; translator; financial advisor
- Known for: Megila di Saraj; Istoria de los Žudios de Bosna (1901)

Moše Rafael ef. Attias, also known as Moše Rafaelović and Zeki Effendi (1845 – 2 July 1916), was a Bosnian historian, journalist, poet, translator and financial advisor, who studied Islam, Persian literature and Bosnian Jewish history. He is regarded as one of the most important personalities in the history of Sarajevo.

== Biography ==
Born to a prominent family of Sarajevo Sephardi Jews in the late Ottoman times, he spent most of his active life during the Austro-Hungarian administration of Bosnia and Herzegovina.

Moše Rafael Attias attended an Ottoman state school in Sarajevo – open to all confessions but mainly attended by Bosnian Muslims – and studied according to an Islamic curriculum. He then moved to Istanbul to perfect his studies on Islamic religion and culture. There he became a scholar of the 13th century Persian poet and mystic Saadi Shirazi. Attias may have even become a Jewish sufi. Attias got the title of effendi, a scholar of Islam, which is visible from the Latin inscription on his grave. He was known in his last years as Zeki Effendi.

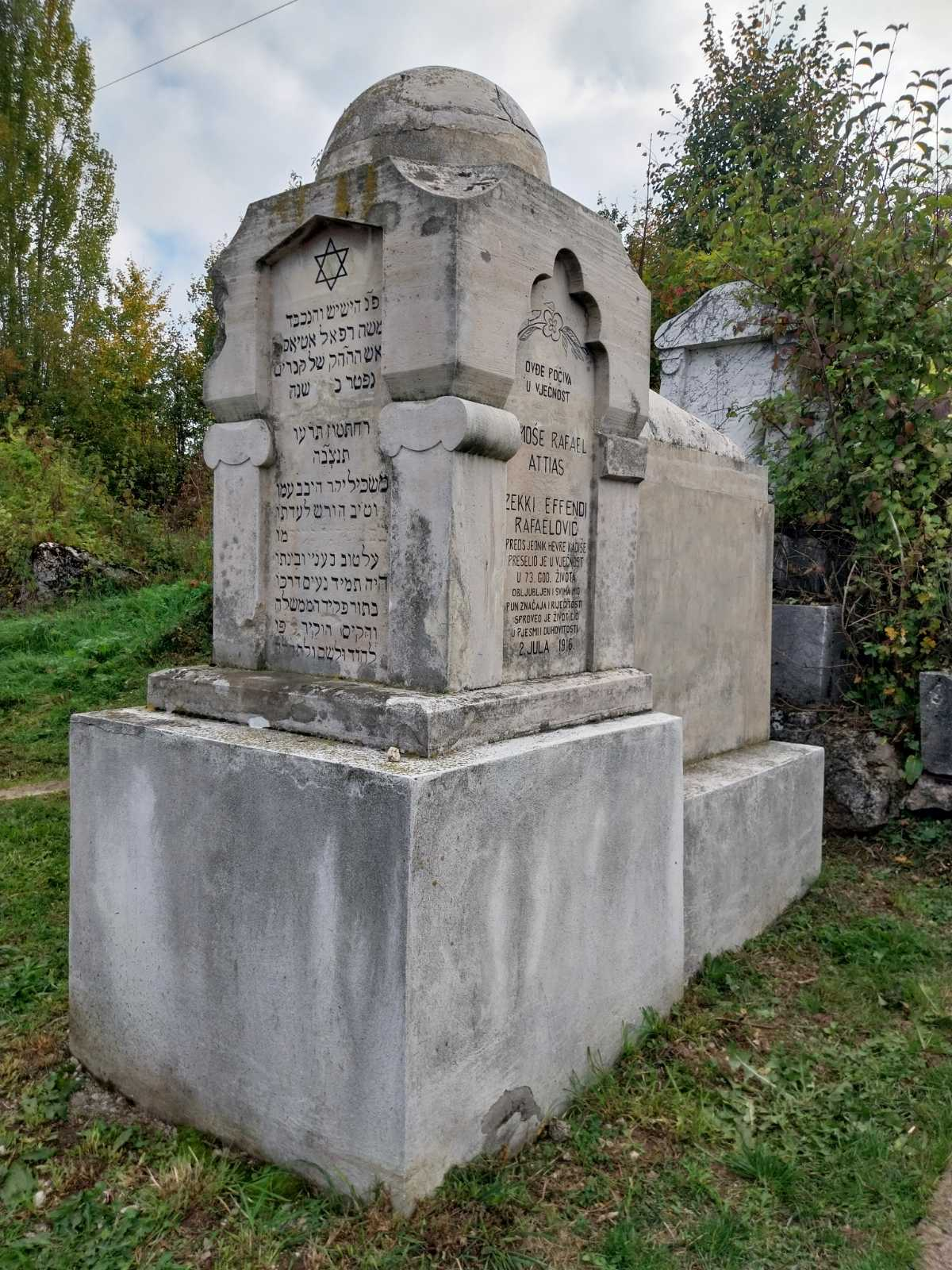
Grave of Zeki Effendi in Sarajevo

He then returned to Sarajevo, where he joined the Ottoman civil service, working for the tax authorities. He remained in town as a financial advisor after the Austro-Hungarian takeover of the capital in 1878.

He was one of founders and treasurer of the Sarajevo Jewish society La Benevolencija, for which he kept a correspondence with Ángel Pulido in Madrid. Also, he was president of Chevra kadisha.

He spoke 8 languages. Zeki Effendi used to write in standard Castilian Spanish language, rather than in the Ladino usually used by Sarajevo Jews, but still using the Hebrew alphabet.

In 1908, his voice was recorded by Julius Subak on his trip to Sarajevo with Abraham A. Cappon – the record is kept at the Vienna Phonogrammarchiv, together with a 1907 recording of one of his poems.

In 1911, Zeki Effendi made a tour of the Balkans together with the renowned Spanish scholar of Sephardic balladry, Manuel Manrique de Lara, recording oral texts from the Sefardi culture of Bosnia and Herzegovina, Serbia and Kosovo.

He died in Sarajevo on July 2, 1916. All newspapers published in Sarajevo at the time announced his death. Laura Papo Bohoreta dedicated a memorial article to Zeki Effendi, a few months after his death, more precisely on the last day of 1916. It was never published. It is kept in a small black notebook in the Archives of the City of Sarajevo. The article is entitled Zeki Effendi eine Erinnerung (Remembering Zeki Effendi), where Bohoreta writes with much love and respect for him.

Zeki Effendi was buried in the Old Jewish Cemetery in Sarajevo. His gravestone contains inscriptions in three scripts: Latin, Hebrew, and Arabic. His gravestone is possibly the only Jewish gravestone in the world containing both the Hebrew and Arabic script.

His descendants did not survive the Holocaust.

== Works ==
Abraham A. Cappon commissioned Zeki Effendi to write an authoritative history of the Bosnian Jews. In 1901 Zeki Effendi published it as "Istoria de los Žudios de Bosna" (History of the Bosnian Jews) in the short-lived Sarajevo Ladino periodical, La Alborada. Under the pen name el Amante de la Luz (the light-lover) – a reference to his illuministic approach to historiography. The work was never finished, only five sequels were published.

Most well-known historiographic piece of Zeki Effendi is "Megila di Saraj" (The Sarajevo Megila), about rabbi Moše Danon. The Megillah was originally written in Ladino. However, the original has been lost. Of the written material, two documents have been preserved that confirm the truthfulness of the events described in the Megillah. It was translated into Bosnian language in 1926. by Isak Samokovlija. On the occasion of celebrating Purim, only the translation into Bosnian language is used today.

== Bibliography ==
- [EN] Phillips Cohen, Julia and Sarah Abrevaya Stein "Sephardic Scholarly Worlds: Towards a Novel Geography of Modern Jewish History" Jewish Quarterly Review 100.3 (Summer 2010), pp. 349–384.
- [ES] Liebl, Christian "Sefarad im Phonogrammarchiv: Cappon, Cantors and Canetti" in Michael Studemund-Halévy, Christian Liebl e Ivana Vucina Simóvic, eds. Sefarad an der Donau. La lengua y literatura de los sefardíes en tierras de los Habsburgo, Barcelona, Tirocinio, 2013, pp. 371–384.
- [EN] Liebl, Christian, "'Avíe úne vez...': Julius Subak, Max A. Luria and phonographic field research among Sephardic communities in the Balkans", in: Los sefardíes ante los retos del mundo contemporáneo: identidad y mentalidades, Paloma Díaz-Mas y María Sánchez Pérez (eds.), Madrid, CSIC, 2010, pp. 240–241.
- [ES] Romero, Elena, La creación literaria en lengua sefardí, Madrid, Mapfre, 1992, pp. 206.
- [HE] Gaon, Moshe David, Yehudé hamizra beerets Yisrael, 2 vols., Jerusalén, Azriel, 1937, p. 514.
- [ES] Pulido, Angel, Españoles sin patria y la raza sefardí, Madrid, Sucesores de Rivadeneyra, 1904, pp. 330–331.
- [SCB] Muhamed Nezirovic', '‘Historija Bosanskih Jevreja Mosˇe (Rafaela) Atijasa – Zeki Efendije,'’ Prilozi 29 (2000): 245–60
