= Tamara Dragičević =

Serbian actress and model

- Тамара Драгичевић
- Born: 30 March 1989 (age 36); Belgrade, SR Serbia, Yugoslavia
- Occupations: Actress, model
- Years active: 2009–present
- Spouse: Petar Benčina
- Children: 3

Tamara Dragičević (Serbian Cyrillic: Тамара Драгичевић, pronounced [ˌtǎmara draˈɡǐːt͡ʃeʋit͜ɕ]; born 30 March 1989) is a Serbian actress and model. She is best known for her performances in the film Montevideo, God Bless You! by Dragan Bjelogrlić and the RTS series The Scent of Rain in the Balkans by Ljubiša Samardžić.

== Personal life ==
Dragičević has two siblings, a brother and a sister. She is a graduate of the University of Dramatic Arts in Belgrade. She is married to Serbian actor Petar Benčina. She gave birth to daughter Staša on 4 December 2016 and son Lazar on 14 August 2019. They are a popular celebrity couple in Serbia. Her brother-in-law is actor Igor Benčina.

== Career ==
Dragičević landed the role in Montevideo, God Bless You!, the upcoming film of Dragan Bjelogrlić, in late 2009. The film premiered on 20 December 2010 in the Sava Centar, and was eventually seen by more than 500.000 viewers. Earlier in 2010, Dragičević was cast as Buka Salom in the RTS series The Scent of Rain in the Balkans, the television adaptation of the novel of the same name by Gordana Kuić, directed by Ljubiša Samardžić. It began airing on 10 December 2010 and ended on 11 March 2011.

In 2011, Dragičević appeared in the music video for single "Slučajno" by Kiki Lesendrić, along with her Montevideo, God Bless You! fellow Miloš Biković. She is currently starring several plays in the Vuk Karadžić and the Boško Buha Theatre. Dragičević would go on to appear in the RTS television series Vojna akademija (English: Military Academy) and its spin-off film Vojna akademija 2, the Montevideo, God Bless You! sequel See You in Montevideo and Bićemo prvaci sveta (English: We Will Be the World Champions). In 2013, Dragičević was one of the contestants in the first season of Tvoje lice zvuči poznato, the Serbian version of Your Face Sounds Familiar.

Her latest film project, Panama, has been selected to screen in the Special Screenings section at the 2015 Cannes Film Festival.

== Filmography ==
Films
Original title	Translation	Year	Role	Notes
Zlatna liga	Golden League	2010	Sportswoman	Short
Montevideo, Bog te video!	Montevideo, God Bless You!	2010	Eli Pops	
Vojna akademija 2	Military Academy 2	2013	Nadica Arsić	
Montevideo, vidimo se!	See You in Montevideo	2013	Eli Pops	
Bićemo prvaci sveta	We Will Be the World Champions	2015	Sonja Mladenović	
Panama	Panama	2015	Sandra	
Toma		2021	Silvana Armenulić	Toma Zdravković biopic
Television
Original title	Translation	Year	Role	Notes
Miris kiše na Balkanu	The Scent of Rain in the Balkans	2010	Buka Salom	2010–11
Vojna akademija	Military Academy	2012	Nadica Arsić	2012–14
Montevideo, Bog te video!	Montevideo, God Bless You!	2010	Eli Pops	
Montevideo, vidimo se!	See You in Montevideo	2013	Eli Pops	
Music videos
Original title	Translation	Year	Role	Artist
"Slučajno"	Accidentally	2011	Female Protagonist	Kiki Lesendrić
