= Old Jewish Cemetery, Sarajevo =

Jewish cemetery in Sarajevo, Bosnia and Herzegovina

Old Jewish cemetery Kovačići
- Staro jevrejsko groblje Kovačići
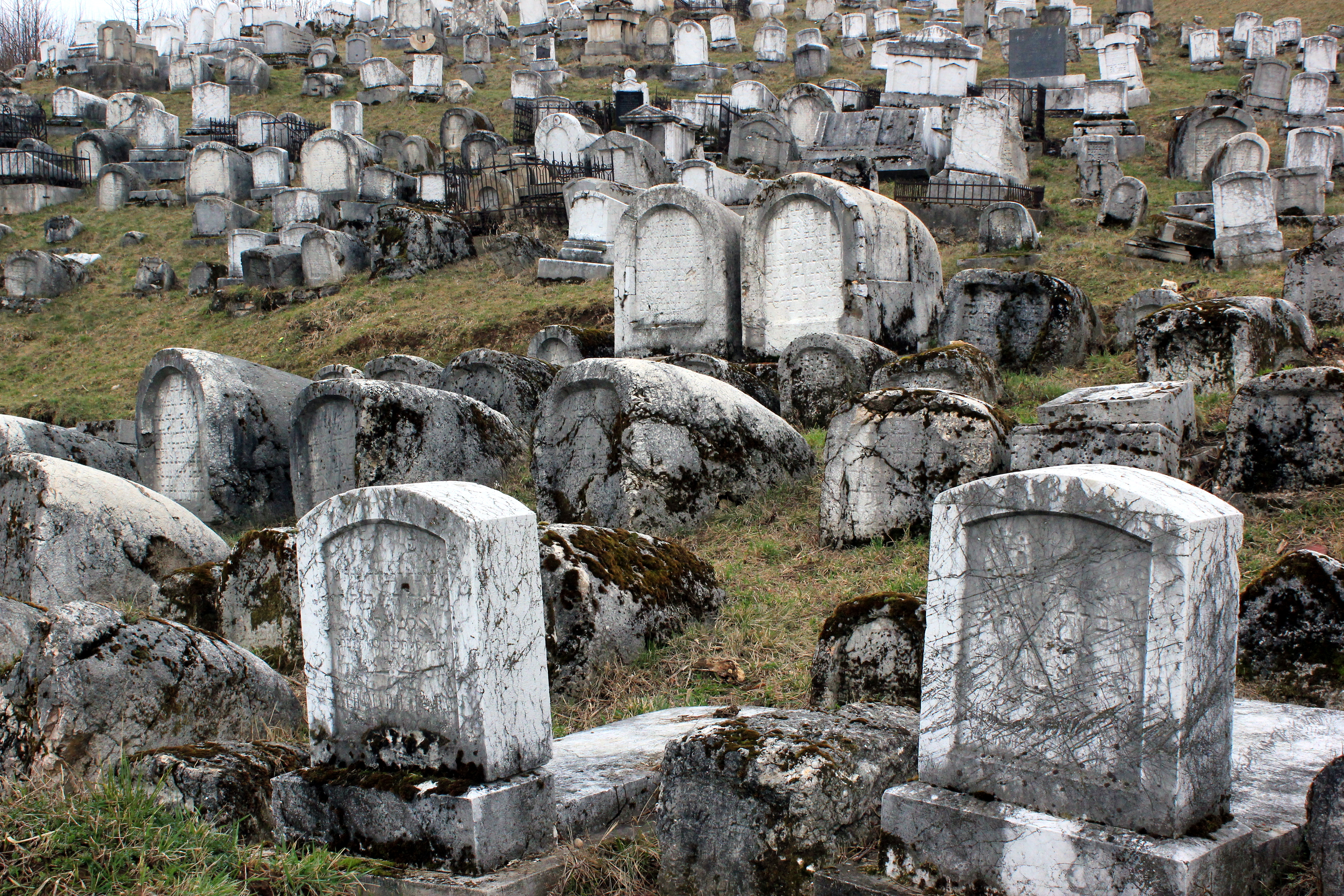
- Interactive map of Old Jewish cemetery Kovačići

Details
- Established: 1630
- Abandoned: closed
- Location: Sarajevo
- Country: Bosnia and Herzegovina
- Type: Jewish
- Owned by: City of Sarajevo
- Size: 31,160 square metres (7.70 acres)
- No. of graves: >3850

KONS of Bosnia and Herzegovina
- Official name: Jewish cemetery in Sarajevo, the burial ground ensemble
- Type: Category I cultural monument
- Criteria: A, B, C i.ii.iii.iv.v.vi., D i.ii.iii.iv.v., E iii.v., F, G v., H, I i.ii.iii.
- Designated: 30 August 2004 (?th session)
- Reference no.: 2502
- Session protocol No: 07.2-02-201/04-4

The OId Jewish Cemetery is a cemetery in Sarajevo, Bosnia and Herzegovina. It is located on the slopes of Trebević mountain, in the Kovačići-Debelo Brdo area, in the south-western part of the city. It is the largest Jewish cemetery in Southeast Europe, and second largest sepulchral complex in Europe after the Old Jewish Cemetery in Prague. It was in use for approximately four hundred years from the beginning of the 16th or 17th century, but most likely from 1630 until 1966.

== History ==
Established by Sephardic Jews in 1630, in Sarajevo during the Ottoman period. It also became the burial ground for Ashkenazi Jews after they arrived in Sarajevo with the Austro-Hungarian Empire in the late 19th century. It contains more than 3850 tombstones and covers an area of 31160 square meters. It has four monuments dedicated to the victims of fascism: a Sephardi one designed by Jahiel Finci and erected in 1952, two Ashkenazi ones, and one dedicated to the victims of Ustasha militants.

=== During war of the 1990s ===
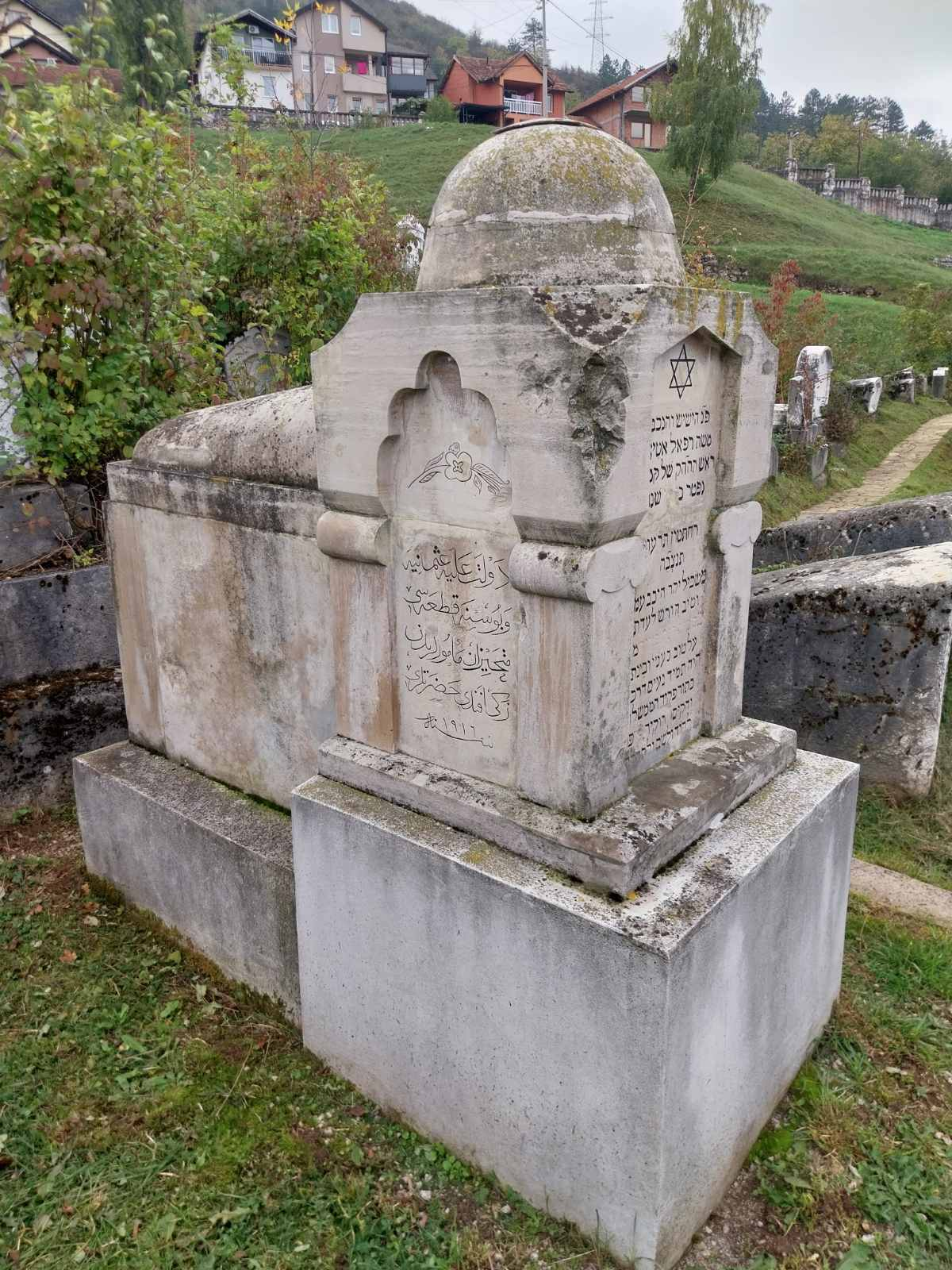
Grave of Moše Rafael Attias

The Jewish Cemetery was on the front line during the war in Bosnia and Herzegovina, and was used as an artillery position by Bosnian Serbs. It was thus severely damaged by bullets and fire caused by explosions. It was also heavily mined but was completely cleared in 1996.

== Notable burials and memorials ==
Notable people buried in the cemetery include Rabbi Samuel Baruh (first rabbi of Sarajevo from 1630 to 1650; his grave is believed to be the oldest in the cemetery), Rabbi Isak Pardo (rabbi from 1781 to 1810), Rabbi Avraham Abinun (Grand Rabbi from 1856 to 1858), Moše Rafael Attias, Laura Papo Bohoreta, and Isak Samokovlija. There are also four memorials erected to the victims of Fascist terror, along with several cenotaphs, an empty memorial tombs, with the names of people who died elsewhere and whose grave locations are unknown.

=== Genizah ===
Separate vault or "grave" for damaged books known as a Genizah, is located in the southeastern part of the cemetery, with the first burial taking place on 3 July 1916. Assumption is that some 14 chests of holy books were buried in the second burial ceremony, so currently exhumation of Geniza is under way to determine its content.

== National and World Heritage designation ==
The cemetery is designated as a national monument of Bosnia and Herzegovina under the name "Jewish cemetery in Sarajevo, the burial ground ensemble". In preparation for nomination for inclusion on the World Heritage Site list, Bosnian delegates submitted "Sepulchral ensemble – Jewish cemetery in Sarajevo" documentation for the tentative list at UNESCO on April 3, 2018, under the "Cultural" category and criteria "(ii)", "(iii)", "(iv)", "(vi)".

== Gallery ==
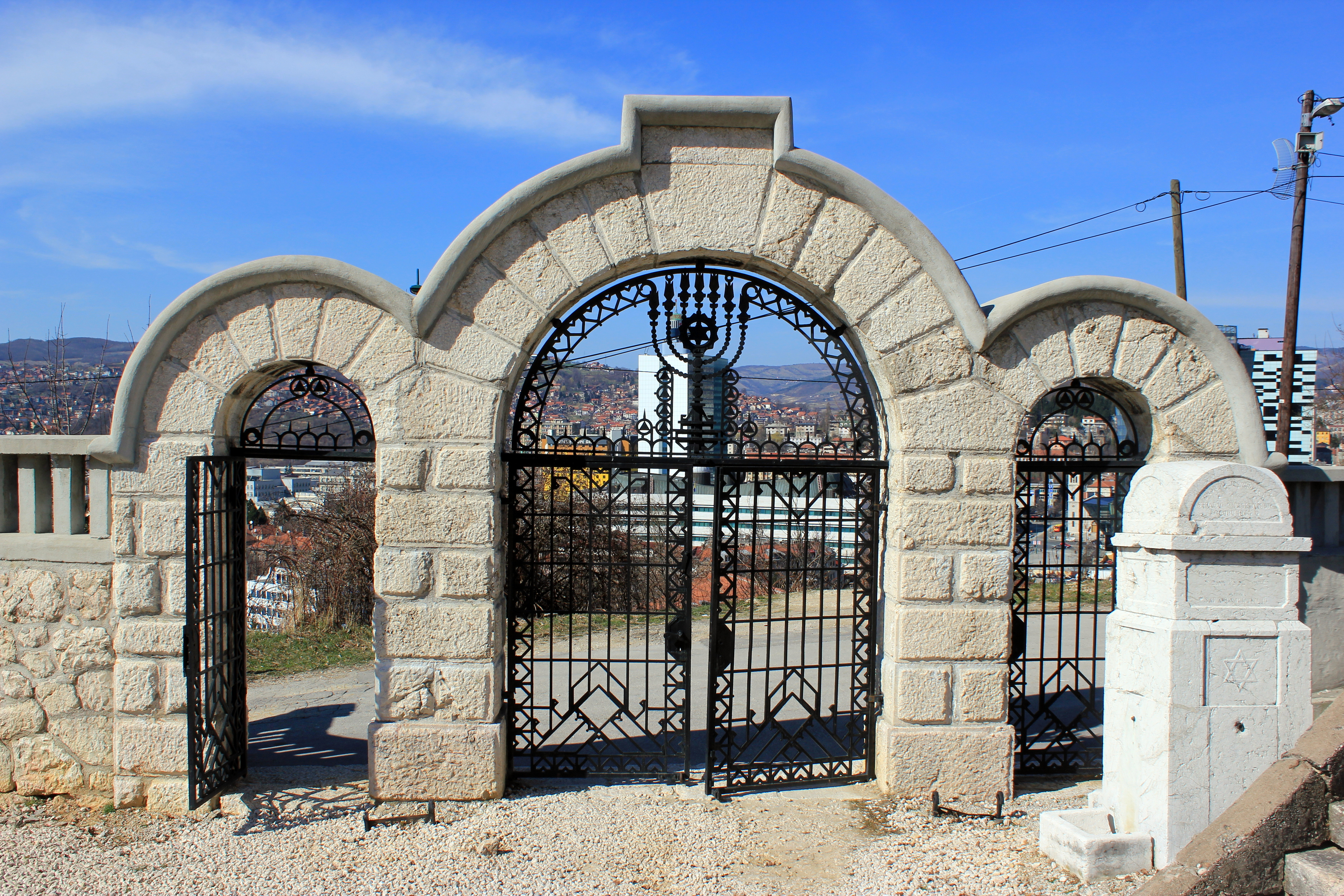
The main gate with a fountain

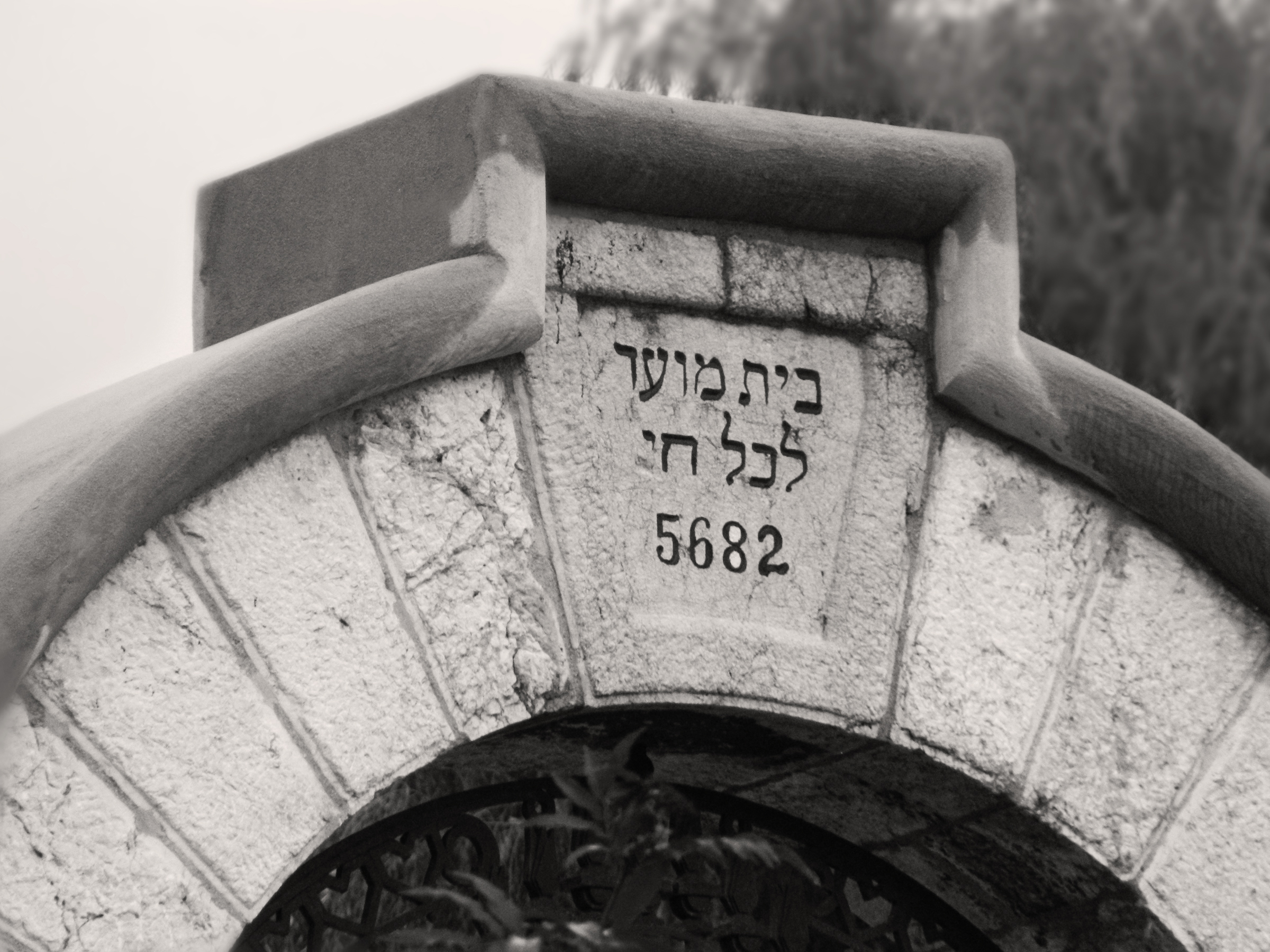
Inscription over the main gate

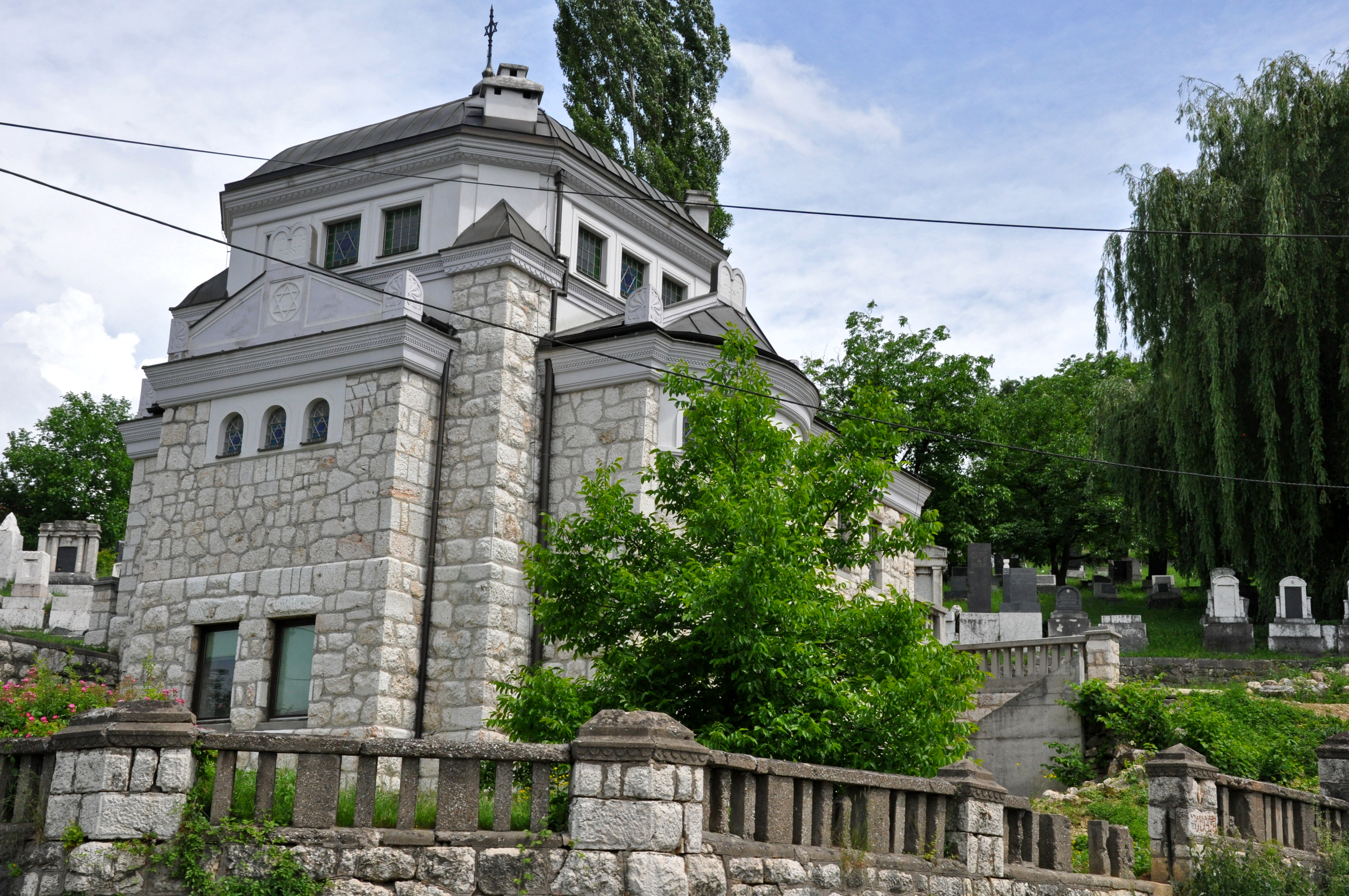
Temple (Ciduk Adin) near main entrance with an old wall

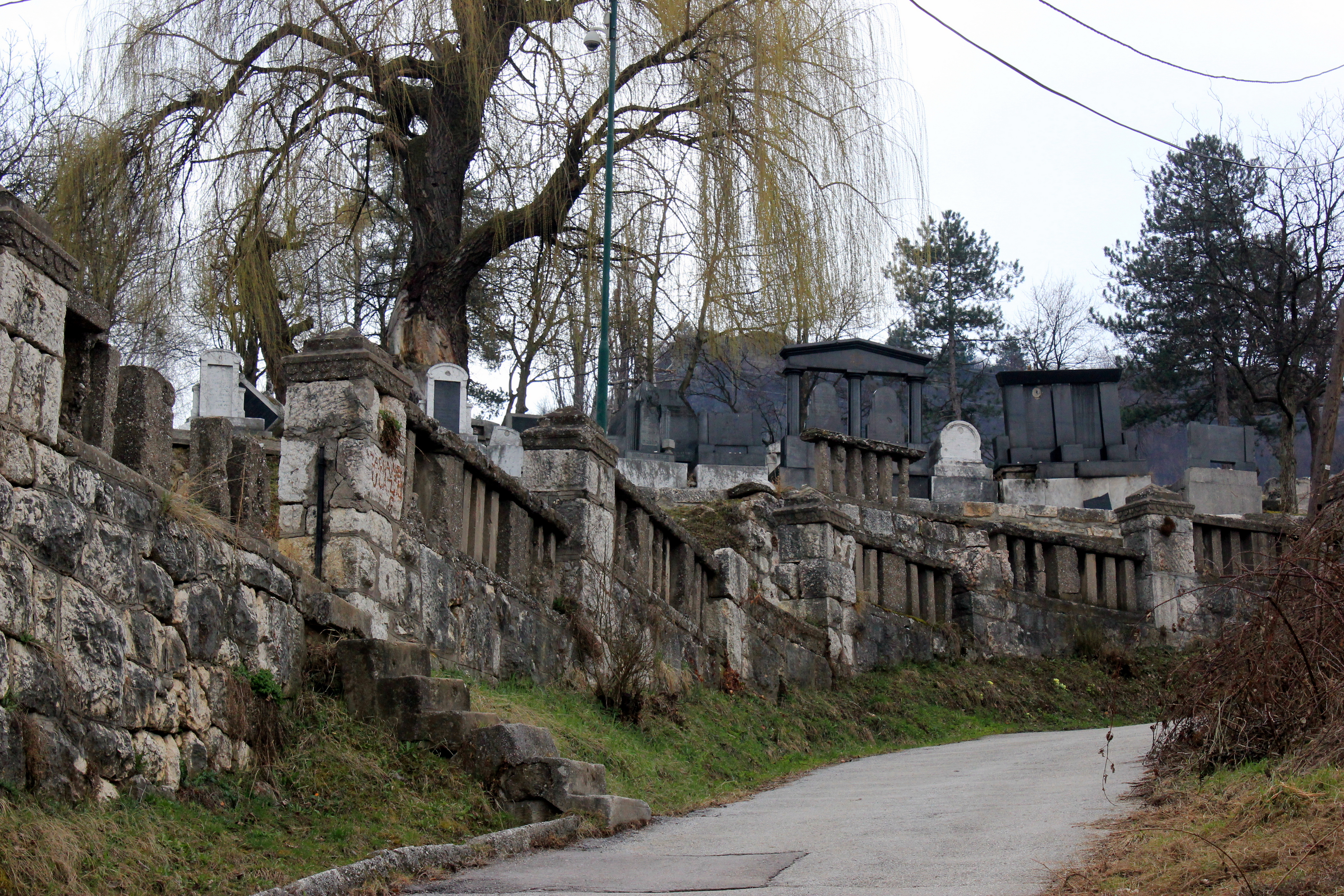
Old wall from the main gate western edge

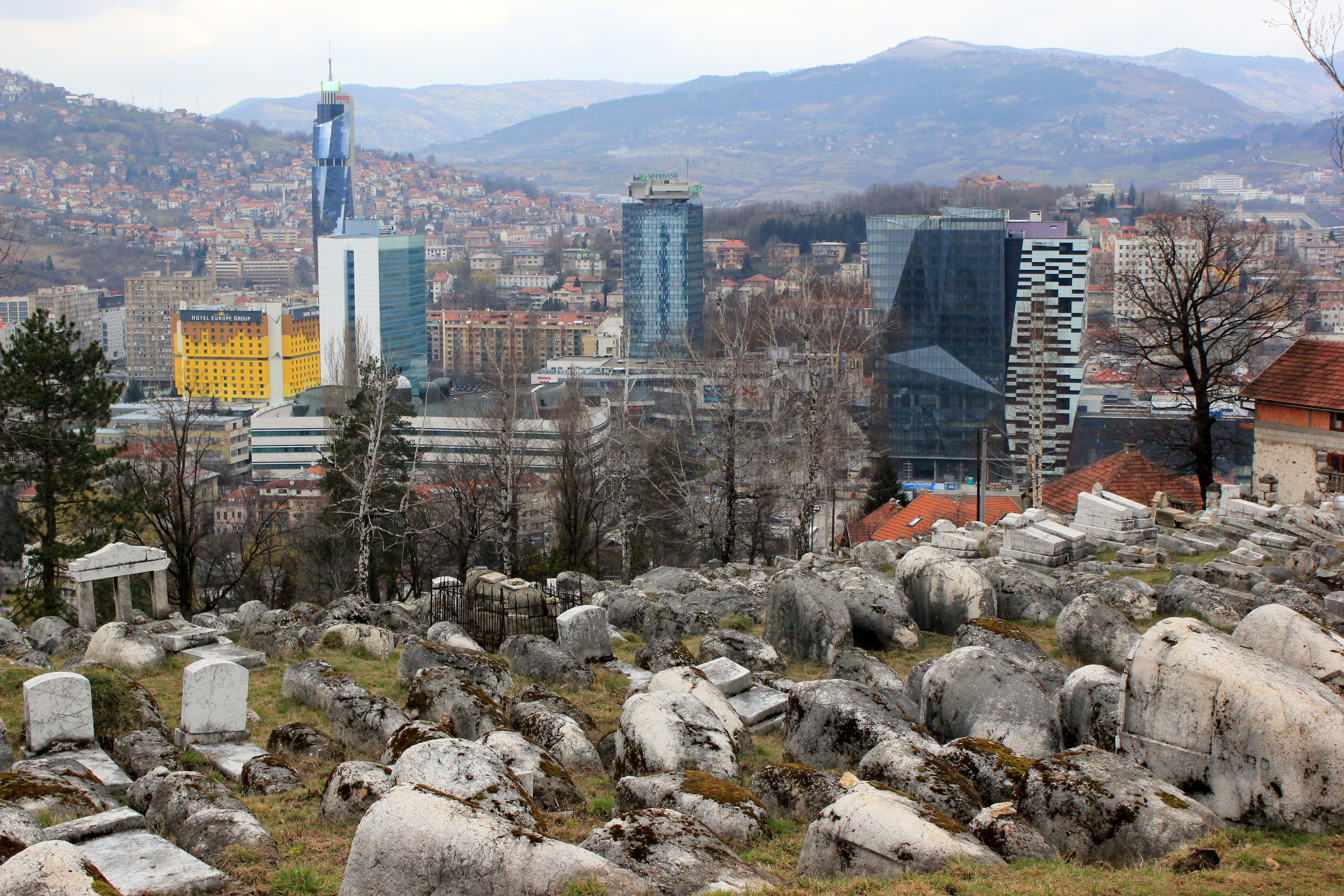
View on city

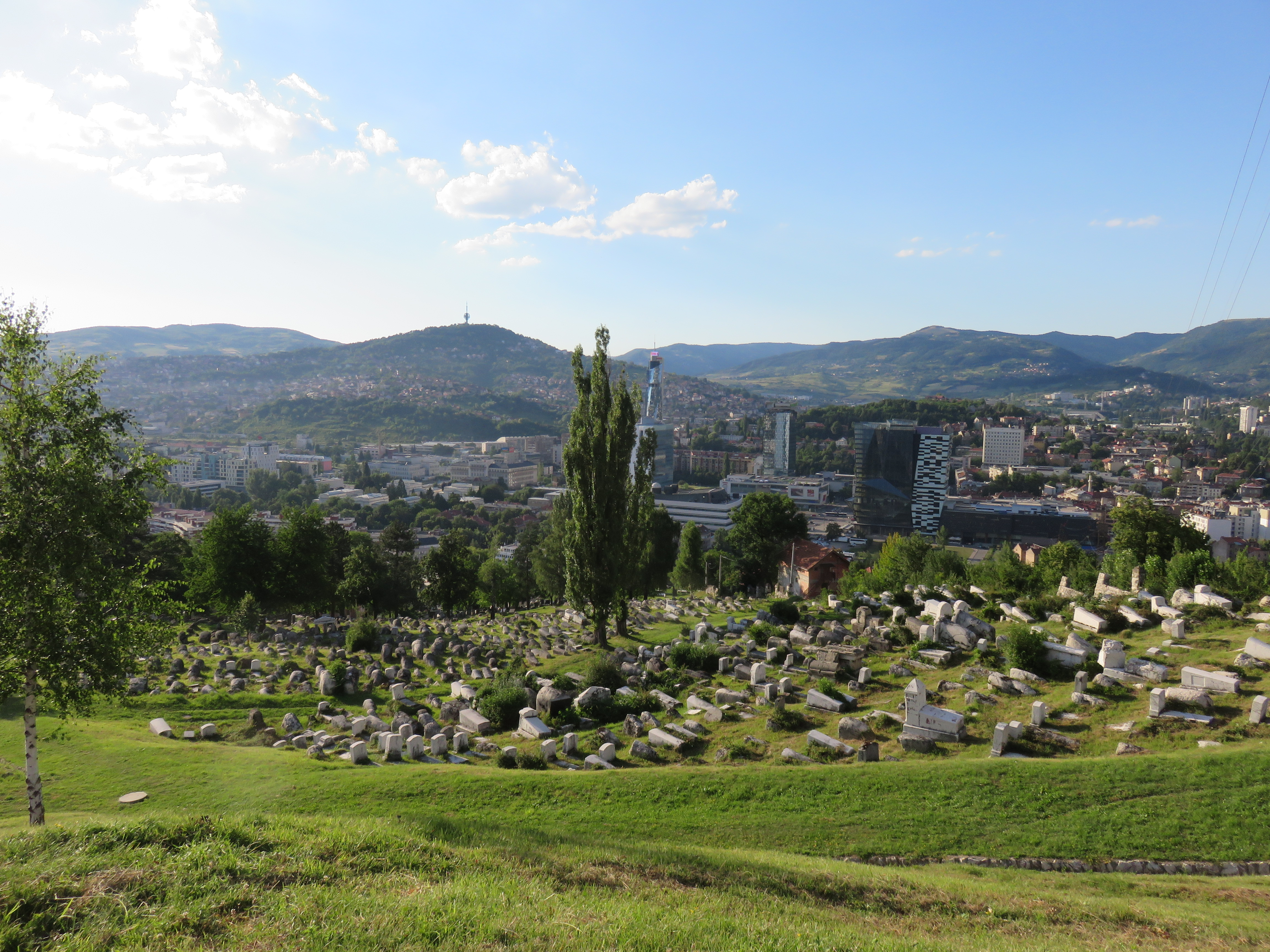
Cityscape from the top of the cemetery

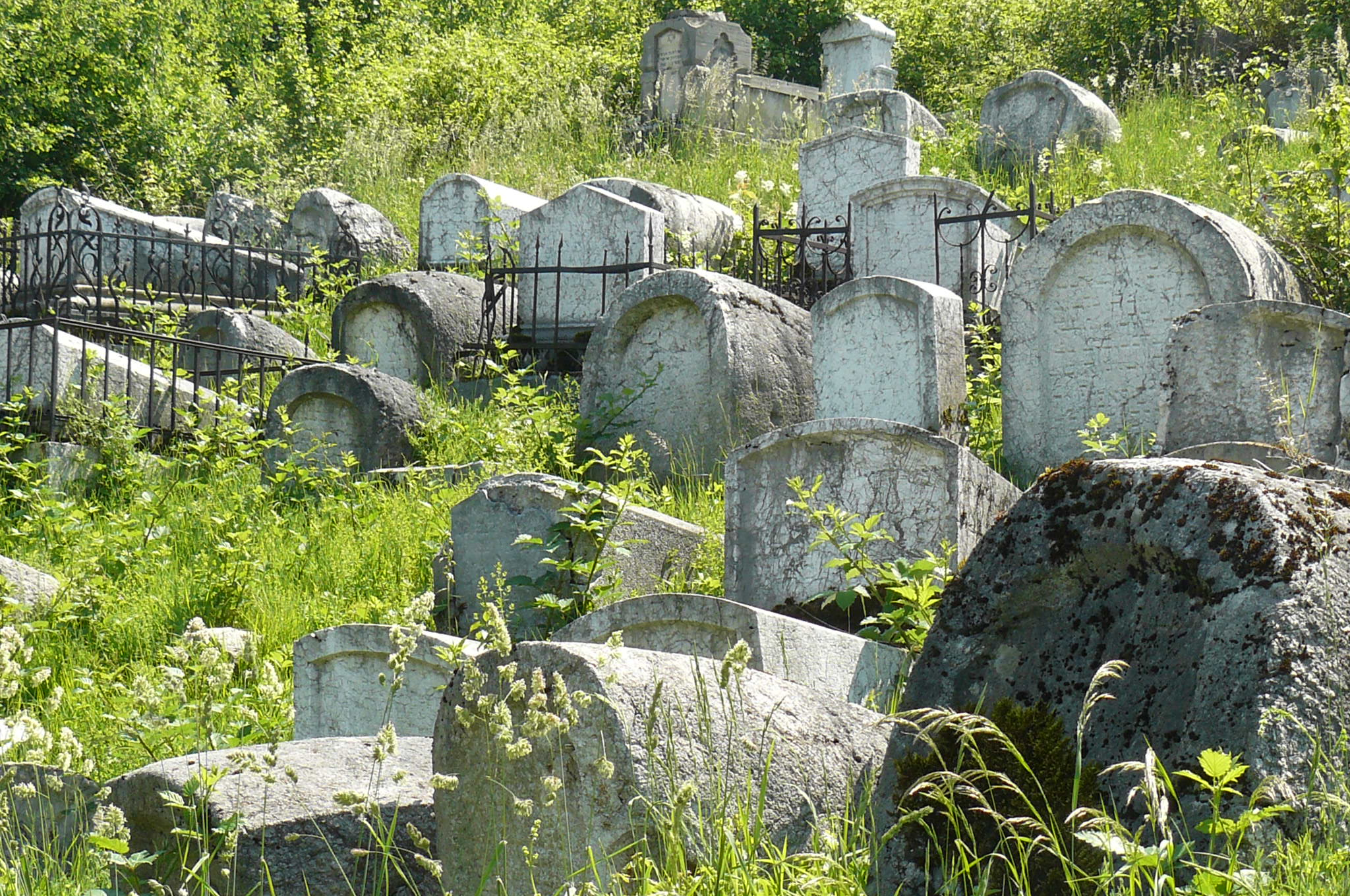
Cemetery

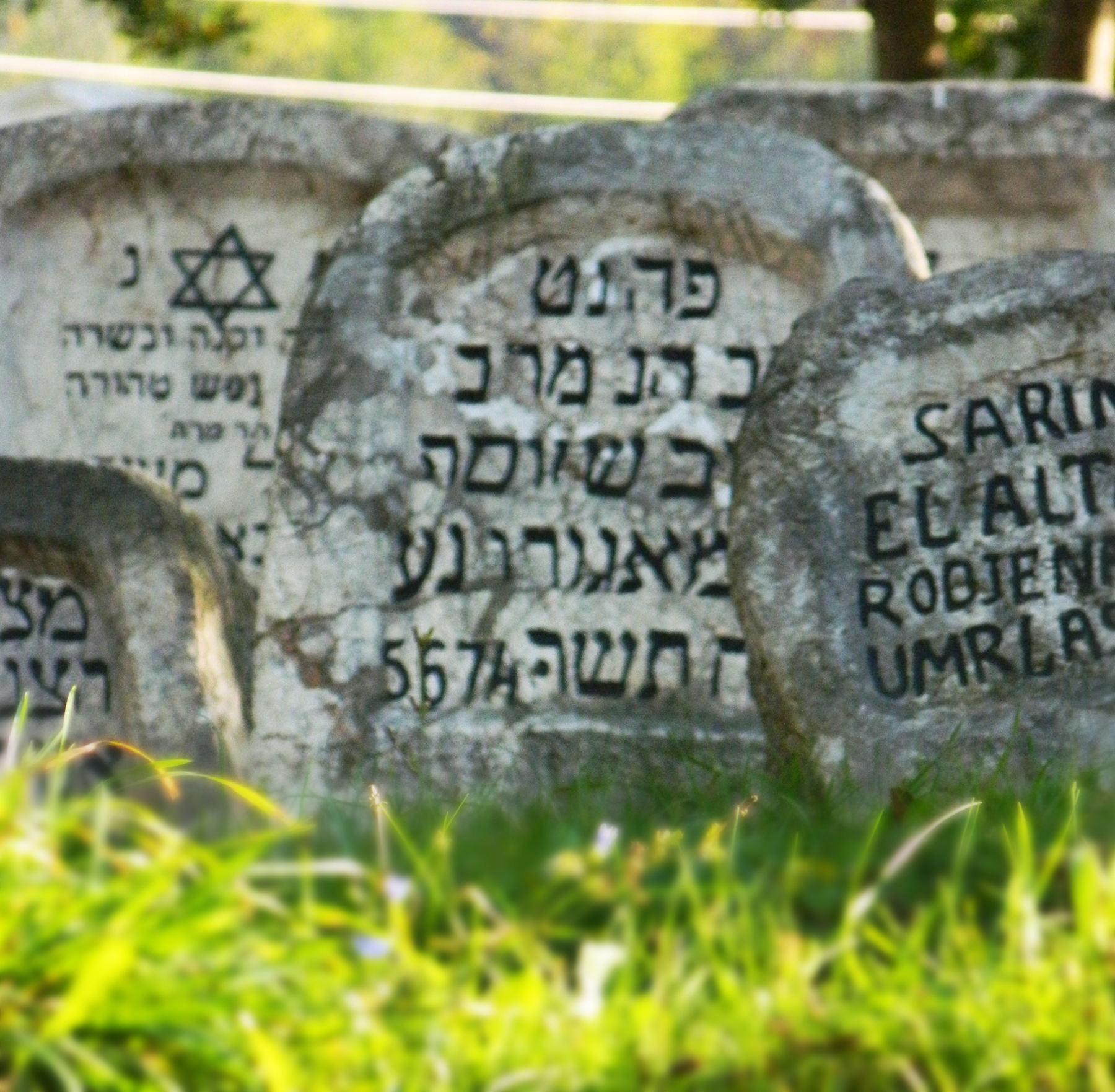
Inscriptions on the tombstones

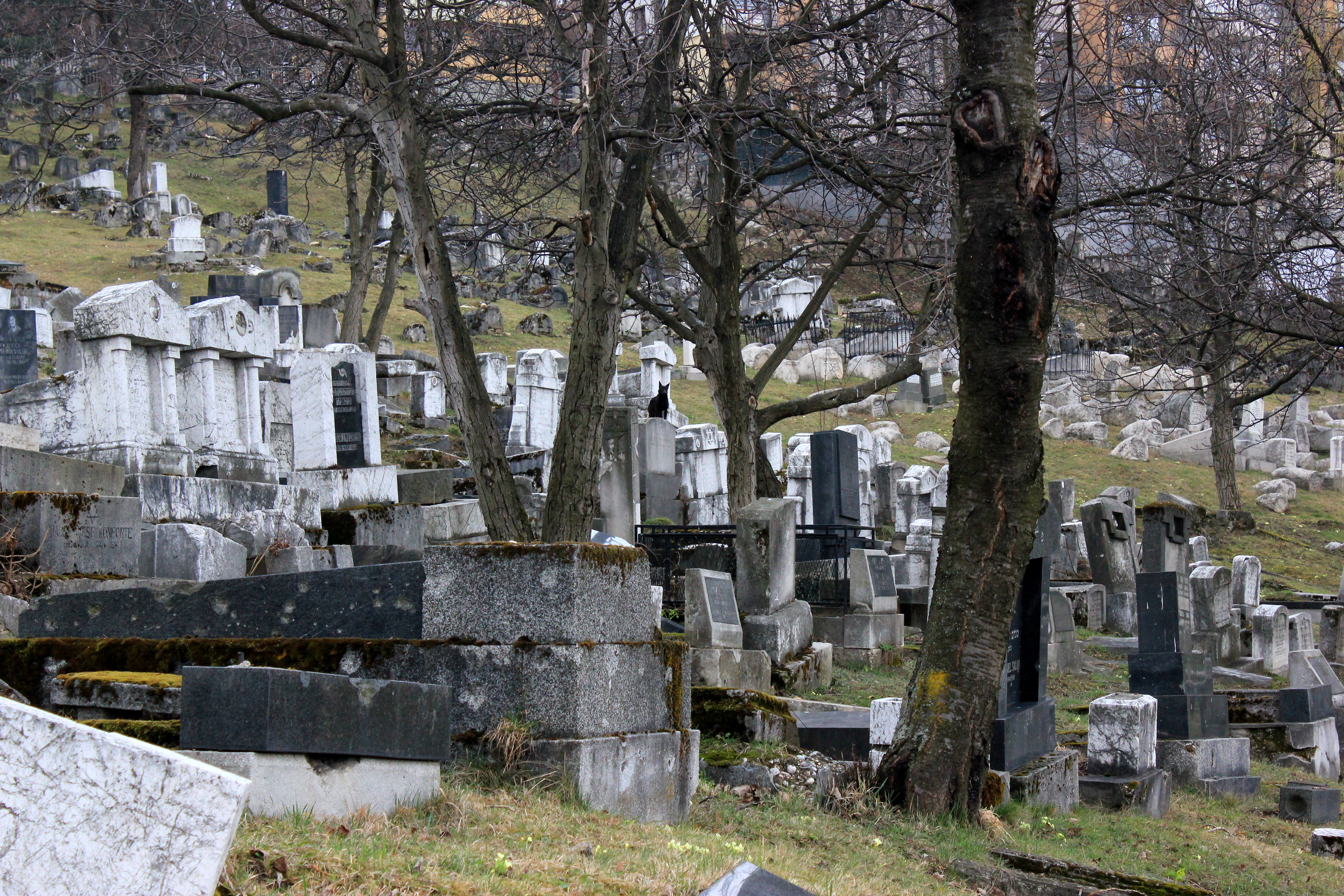
Winter ambient

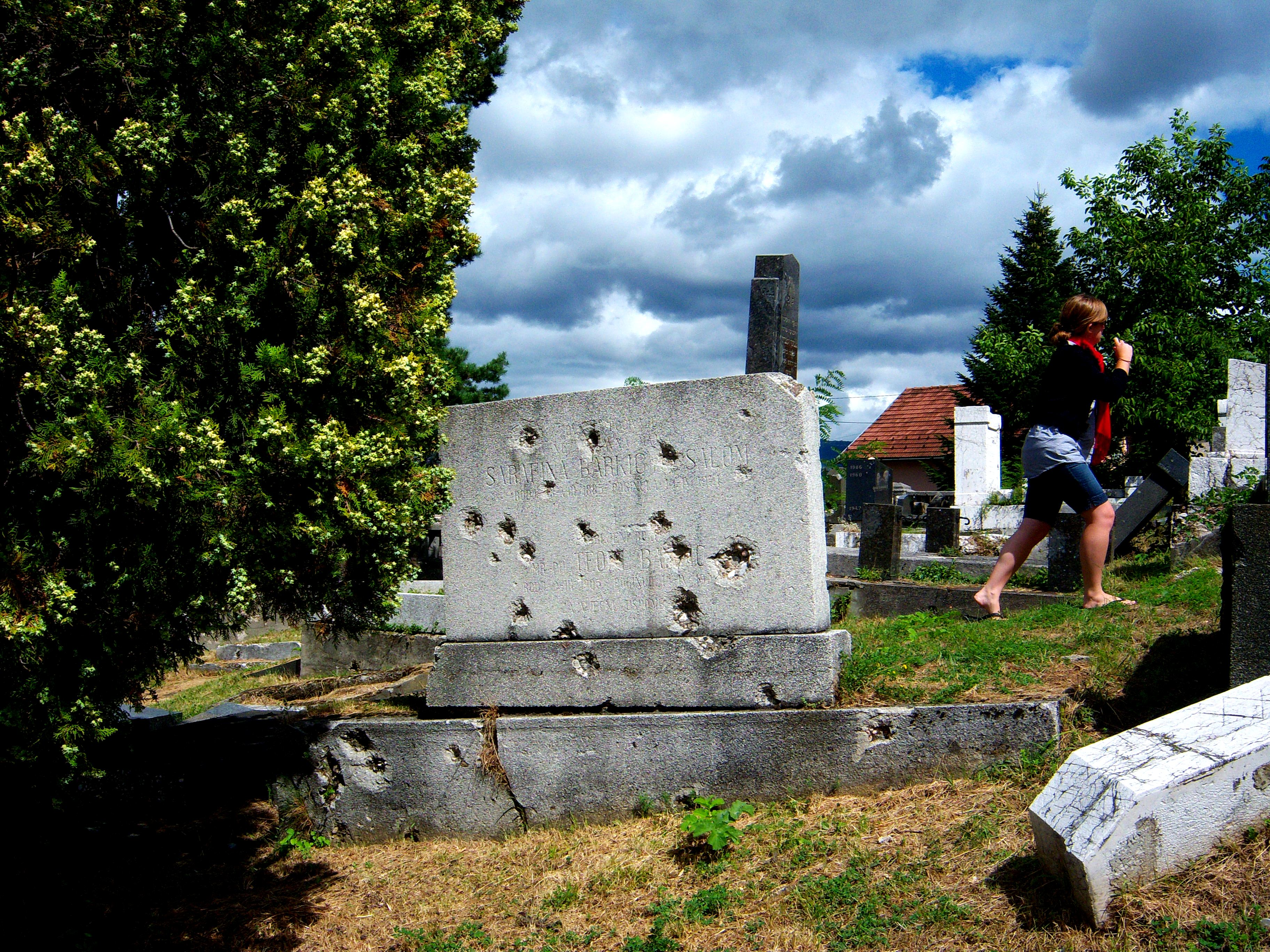
Traces of mortar shells and bullet holes

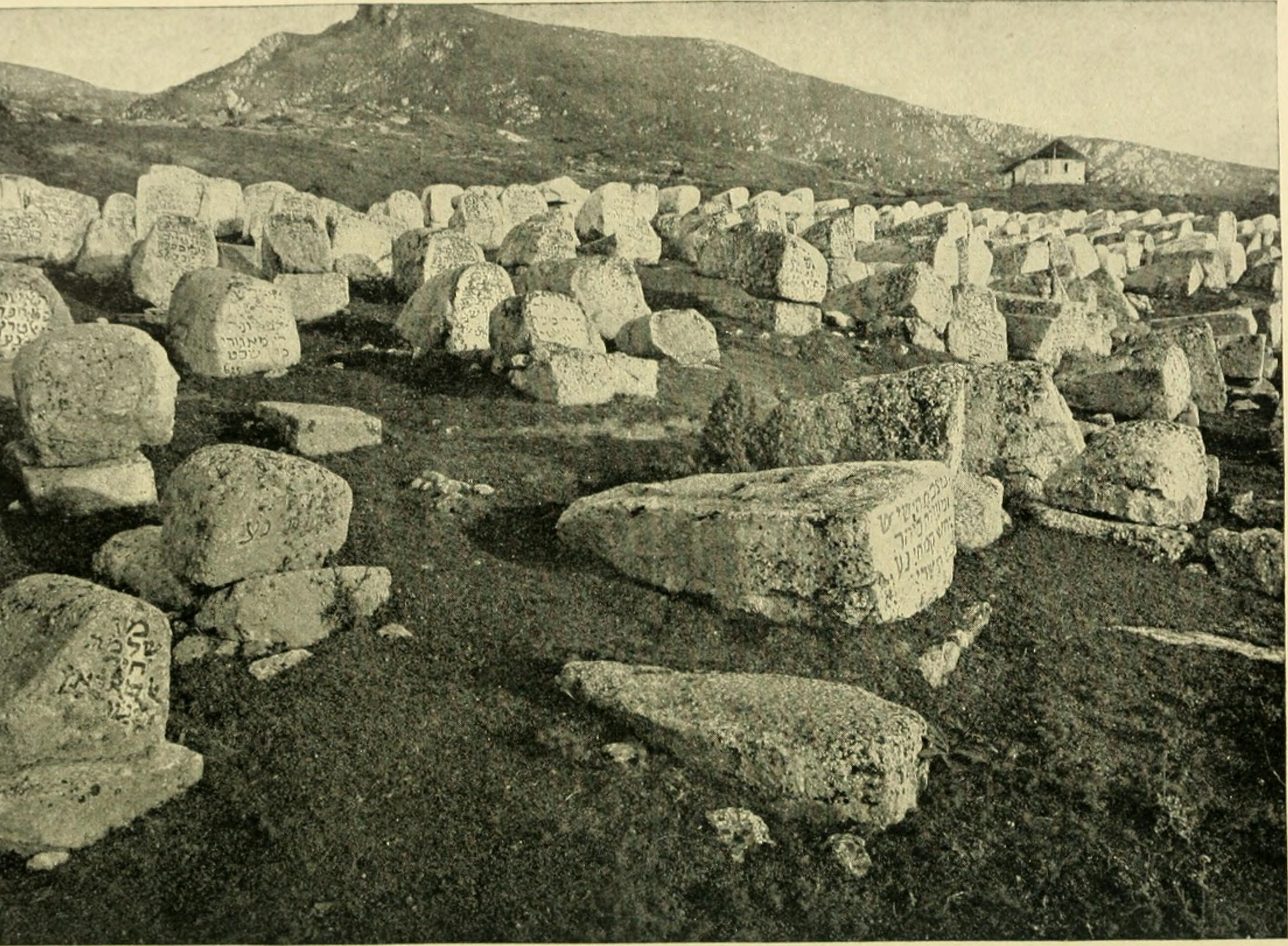
Cemetery second half of the 19th century, beginning of the Austro-Hungarian period

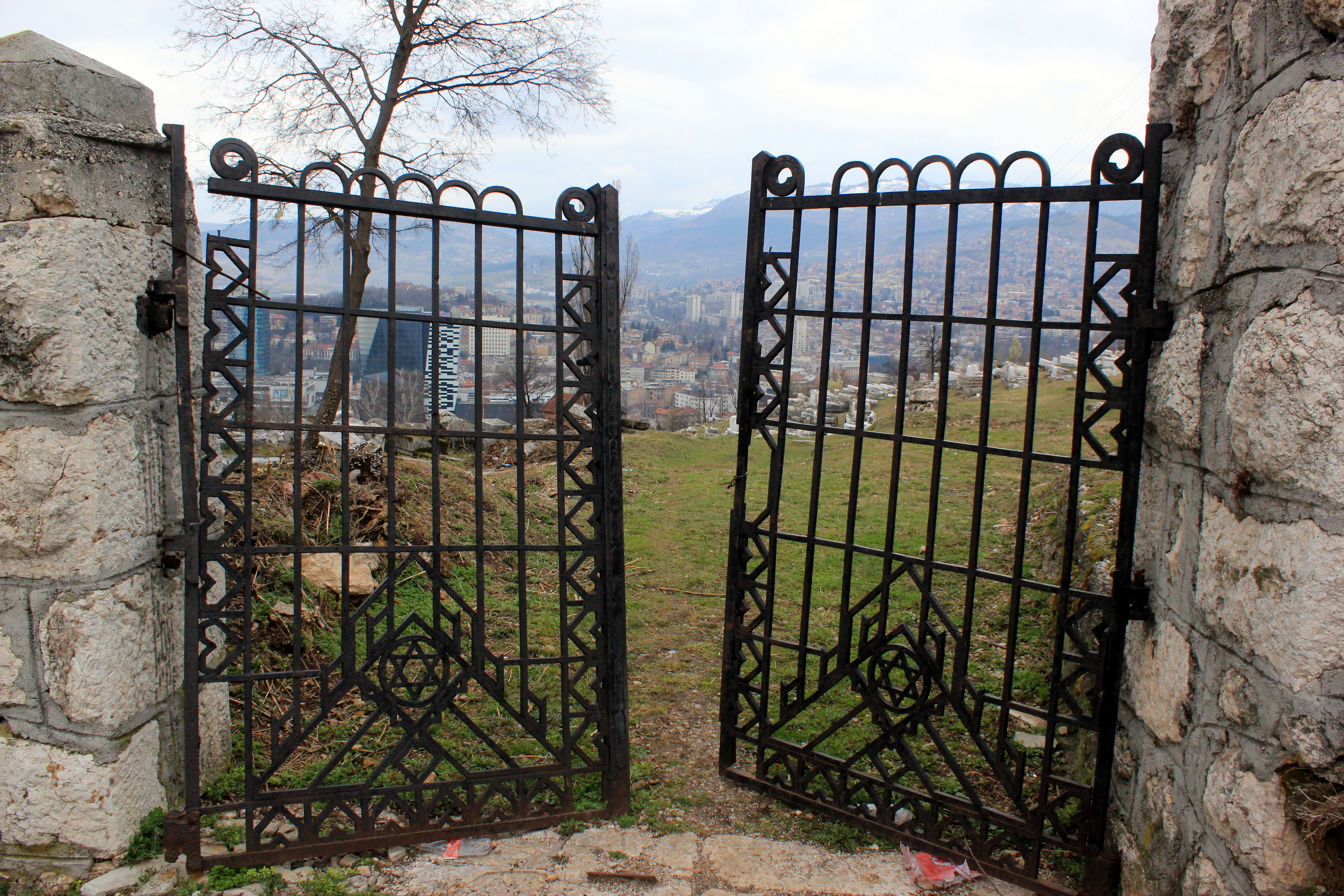
Upper gate, highest point at the southern edge

== See also ==
- History of the Jews in Bosnia and Herzegovina
- Moshe ben Rafael Attias
- Isak Samokovlija
