= Petar Benčina =

Serbian actor (born 1984)

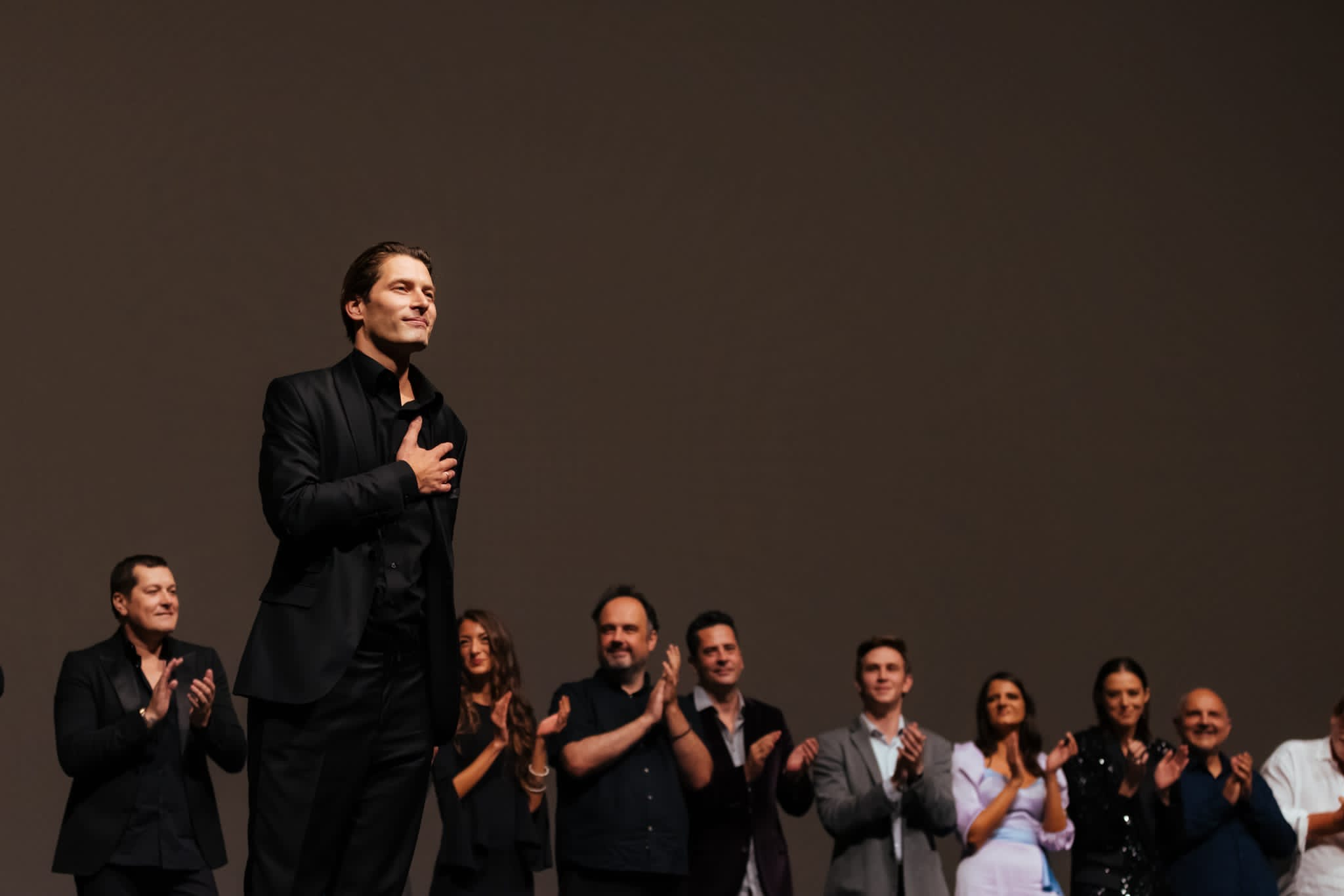
- Born: 7 December 1984 (age 41); Zemun, Belgrade, SR Serbia, SFR Yugoslavia
- Occupation: Actor
- Known for: Television series "Komsije" (Neighbours)
- Spouse: Tamara Dragicevic
- Website: https://www.instagram.com/petarbencina/

Petar Benčina (Serbian Cyrillic: Петар Бeнчина; born 7 December 1984) is a Serbian actor born in Zemun.

== Biography ==
Petar Benčina has been a regular cast member on the Serbian television series "Komsije" (Neighbours) and "Psi laju, vetar nosi". Other roles on Serbian TV include "Vojna akademija", "Gorki plodovi" (Bitter Fruit), "Zaustavi vreme", and "Miris kise na Balkanu".

Benčina has acted in several Serbian films such as "Igra istine" (Game of Truth), "Masa" and "Volja sinovljeva" (Son's Will). He also had a role in the American-British co-production "The November Man" starring Pierce Brosnan.

Additionally, Benčina is a theater actor who regularly performs at the Belgrade Drama Theatre. His very first acting role was at the same venue when he was twenty-one years old. He has won three "Tatjana Lukjanova" awards for his performances there. According to Benčina, he enjoys acting in plays because the audience changes every night, "Although you play the same show, every night is another audience and it's different, so there is some specificity related to the theater."

== Personal life and family ==
He is married to Serbian actress Tamara Dragicevic and they have a daughter together. He and his wife are a popular celebrity couple in Serbia. His brother, Igor Benčina, is also an actor, seen in the Serbian film "Teret" (Cargo) which was screened at the Cannes Film Festival, as well as the British thriller "The Last Panthers", a television show popular with former UK Prime Minister David Cameron.
