= Milena Preindlsberger-Mrazović =

Bosnian journalist, writer and piano composer, editor

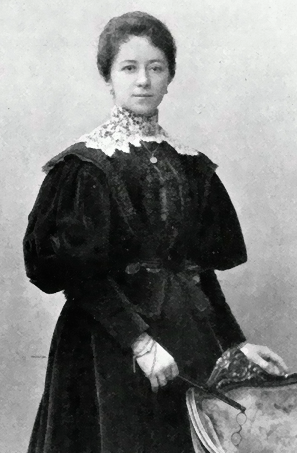
Photograph of "Frau Milena Mrazovic", by Carl Pietzner, in an 1899 article in The Sketch

Milena Preindlsberger-Mrazović (28 December 1863 – 20 January 1927) was a Bosnian journalist, writer, pianist and composer in Austria-Hungary. Mrazović is credited for introducing Bosnia and Herzegovina, where she lived for 40 years, to the German-speaking public. She was the first Bosnian journalist and the author of the first classical compositions on its soil but remains best known for the travel books she wrote during her long journeys. While horseback riding through remote mountain villages, Mrazović recorded Bosnian oral tradition and collected traditional costumes, building a valuable collection.

== Early life ==
Milena Mrazović was born on 28 December 1863. There are no precise records on her birth, and sources give conflicting information. She comes from a noble family from the town of Bjelovar, at the time part of the Croatian Military Frontier, Austrian Empire, and it is possible she was also born there. Belonging to a middle-class family, she was educated in a girls school in Budapest. She moved with her family in 1878 to Banja Luka, where her father Andrija was appointed an administrative officer, several weeks after Bosnia-Herzegovina was occupied by Austria-Hungary. The next year, the family moved to Sarajevo, Bosnia-Herzegovina's capital.

== Music ==
A pianist and composer, Mrazović took part in the first concert of classical music in Bosnia-Herzegovina, held in Banja Luka in May 1881 in honor of the birthday of Crown Princess Stephanie. Between 1879 and 1882, Mrazović composed the Württemberg Marsch in honor of Duke William of Württemberg, then governor of Bosnia and Herzegovina. Osmanisch Mazurka and Bosnia-Polka Francaize were printed in Vienna in 1882. These are the earliest known traces of musical compositions in Bosnia-Herzegovina.

== Journalism ==
From 1884 to 1885, Mrazović taught French to girls at the Sisters of Charity convent school in Sarajevo. At the same time, she practiced writing. Her first article was published in the Neue Augsburger Postzeitung. In 1884, Mrazović started contributing to the German language newspaper Bosnische Post. Eugen von Toepfer, who had come from Vienna to Sarajevo in 1881, bought the newspaper in 1886. Shortly after becoming engaged to Mrazović, Toepfer became terminally ill. He named Mrazović his sole heir and died in 1889. In September 1889, the government of Bosnia-Herzegovina granted Mrazović permission to continue publishing the Bosnische Post as her fiancé's heir. This not only made her the first female editor-in-chief and publisher in Bosnia-Herzegovina, but also the first professional journalist in the province.

In addition to being the proprietor of a newspaper, Mrazović became a Telegraph correspondent, radio news editor, and contributor to nearly all German-language newspapers. The Reichspost was particularly appreciative of Mrazović's articles, which she published under the pseudonym Milan. The international media hailed her success in 1894, when the Bosnische Post celebrated its tenth anniversary, emphasizing that women in Bosnia-Herzegovina normally took no part in public life. In 1893–94, Mrazović built an apartment block with newspaper offices and a printing shop on the ground floor in Cukovicgasse (today's Muvekita street). Her first book, a collection of novels titled Selam, inspired by Bosnian Muslims, was published in 1893. The book having been very well received by critics, Mrazović proceeded to print the poems of Grga Martić in her own shop.

Mrazović's newspaper was an important government concession but she refused to bow to the government's will in her articles. The government commissioner for Sarajevo, Lothar Berks, described Mrazović as an "unbearable, quarrelsome, scheming woman, who is under the influence of hideous delusions and is usually in a more or less hysterical condition, regarding the manifold, sometimes crucial, questions involved in important matters of state." The government was eager to see her sell the newspaper to someone malleable.

Mrazović lived in the apartment above her printing shop until 1896, when she finally sold the Bosnische Post, as well as the printing and publishing business, and married the Viennese physician Josef Preindlsberger von Preindlsperg who was at the time a primarius at the Land Hospital in Sarajevo. She continued writing books and articles for European newspapers, covering important events such as the Annexation Crisis, the assassination of Archduke Franz Ferdinand, and the trial of Gavrilo Princip.

== Ethnography ==
Mrazović was keenly interested in ethnography. She was one of the founders of the National Museum of Bosnia-Herzegovina in 1888 and its regular benefactor. In 1889, Mrazović became the first woman to be accepted into the Anthropological Society in Vienna. In February 1896, at the invitation of the Ethnographic Society, she gave the first lecture about Bosnia-Herzegovina in Vienna.

As a travel writer, Mrazović presented Bosnia-Herzegovina to the German-speaking world. Accompanied by the painter Augusta Bock, Mrazović traveled throughout Bosnia-Herzegovina on horseback. The women reached very remote places, recording folk tales, riddles, customs, and recipes. On these journeys, Mrazović collected and classified traditional costumes. Two of her travel books were published in Innsbruck: Bosnisches Skizzenbuch in 1900, followed in 1905 by a collection of folk tales called Bosnische Volksmaerchen. Mrazović's greatest success came with Bosnische Ostbahn, published in Vienna in 1908.

== Exile, death, and legacy ==
During the World War I, Mrazović accompanied her husband to Serbia, Montenegro, Albania, and Italy, assisting him as a nurse. Austria-Hungary was defeated and dissolved, with Bosnia and Herzegovina becoming part of the Kingdom of Serbs, Croats, and Slovenes. Mrazović and her husband were deported to Austria, which she considered a "foreign land". She was already gravely ill when she gave her final lecture about Bosnia and Herzegovina, in Urania, Vienna, in May 1926. She died on 20 January 1927 in Löw Sanatorium.

After the World War II, one of Mrazović's two sons brought his mother's ethnographic collection to Bosnia and Herzegovina and donated it to the National Museum in Sarajevo, as she had wished. Despite being described as a "celebrated Bosnian writer", Mrazović and her works, almost all written in German, remain little-known in Bosnia and Herzegovina.

== Sources ==
- Petrović, Ivica (2023). "Milena Preindlsberger-Mrazović – novinarka i književnica" [Milena Preindlsberger-Mrazović – Journalist and Writer]. Mostariensia (in Croatian). 27 (2). University of Mostar: 97–110. ISSN 2831-0322.
