= The Scent of Rain in the Balkans (TV series) =

Serbian television series

- Genre: Historical drama
- Based on: The Scent of Rain in the Balkans by Gordana Kuić
- Screenplay by: Đorđe Milosavljević
- Story by: Gordana Kuić
- Directed by: Ljubiša Samardžić
- Starring: See the list below
- Country of origin: Serbia
- Original languages: Serbian; Ladino
- No. of episodes: 14

Production
- Producer: Mirjana Samardžić
- Running time: 40 minutes
- Production company: Cinema Design

Original release
- Network: RTS
- Release: December 10, 2010 – March 11, 2011

Related
- The Blossom of Linden in the Balkans

The Scent of Rain in the Balkans (Serbian: Мирис кише на Балкану / Miris kiše na Balkanu) is a Serbian television series, adapted from the 1986 novel of the same name by Gordana Kuić. Consisting of fourteen episodes, it was directed by actor, director and producer Ljubiša Samardžić, and produced by his wife Mirjana. The series was broadcast on the RTS1 once in a week from 11 December 2010 to 11 March 2011. The Scent of Rain in the Balkans was filmed in Belgrade, Sarajevo, Zagreb and Dubrovnik.

The sequel to the series, The Blossom of Linden in the Balkans, is expected to be premiered in 2011.

== Cast and characters ==
- Mirka Vasiljević as Blanka "Blanki" Salom
- Aleksandra Bibić as Rifketa "Riki" Salom
- Kalina Kovačević as Nina Salom
- Tamara Dragičević as Laura "Buka" Salom
- Marija Vicković as Klara Salom
- Stefan Buzurović as Isak "Atleta" Salom
- Ljiljana Blagojević as Estera Salom
- Predrag Ejdus as Leon Salom
- Siniša Ubović as Marko Korać
- Goran Navojec as Škoro "Ignjo" Ignjatić
- Igor Damjanović as Miloš Ranković
- Milan Vasić as Danijel Papo
- Stipe Kostanić as Ivo Valić
- Srđan Karanović as Vladeta Dragutinović
- Dragan Petrović as David
- Aleksandra Alač as Didi Valić
- Jelisaveta Seka Sabljić as Nona Salom

== Differences from the novel ==
- In the series, there is an elderly Blanki as a narrator.
- In the novel, Leon and Estera have seven children, five daughters (Buka, Nina, Klara, Blanki and Riki) and two sons (Isak and Elijas). However, the character of Elijas was written out of the series.
- In the novel, Buka was in love with Danijel when she married him. In the series, she was previously in love with David, a man much older than her, who does not exist in the book. Buka would later fall in love with her husband.
- In the series, Blanki saves Marko from getting executed by causing him diabetes complications by sending him a sweetened rice pudding. In the novel, she simply helps him get away from the Ustaše jail.
- In the series, Blanki senses her mother's death and suddenly abandons a dinner with Marko and some friends; while in the novel, there are no details on how Estera died.
- In the series, the Salom family initially lives in house with a large garden. In the book, they lived in an apartment.

== Broadcasting ==
Country	Channel	Broadcast debut	Broadcast ending
Serbia	RTS1	11 December 2010	11 March 2011
Bosnia and Herzegovina	BHT 1, RTRS, FTV		
Croatia	HRT	6 July 2011	6 October 2011
Slovenia	RTVSLO	22 June 2014	21 September 2014

== Sequel ==
The sequel series to The Scent of Rain in the Balkans, The Blossom of Linden in the Balkans, premiered in late 2011. The series was filmed in Belgrade, and it was directed by Ivan Stefanović. The Blossom of Linden in the Balkans stars Nataša Ninković, Vojin Ćetković, Paulina Manov, Vanja Milačić, Slobodan Ćustić and others.
