= Abraham A. Cappon =

Bosnian journalist (1853–1930)

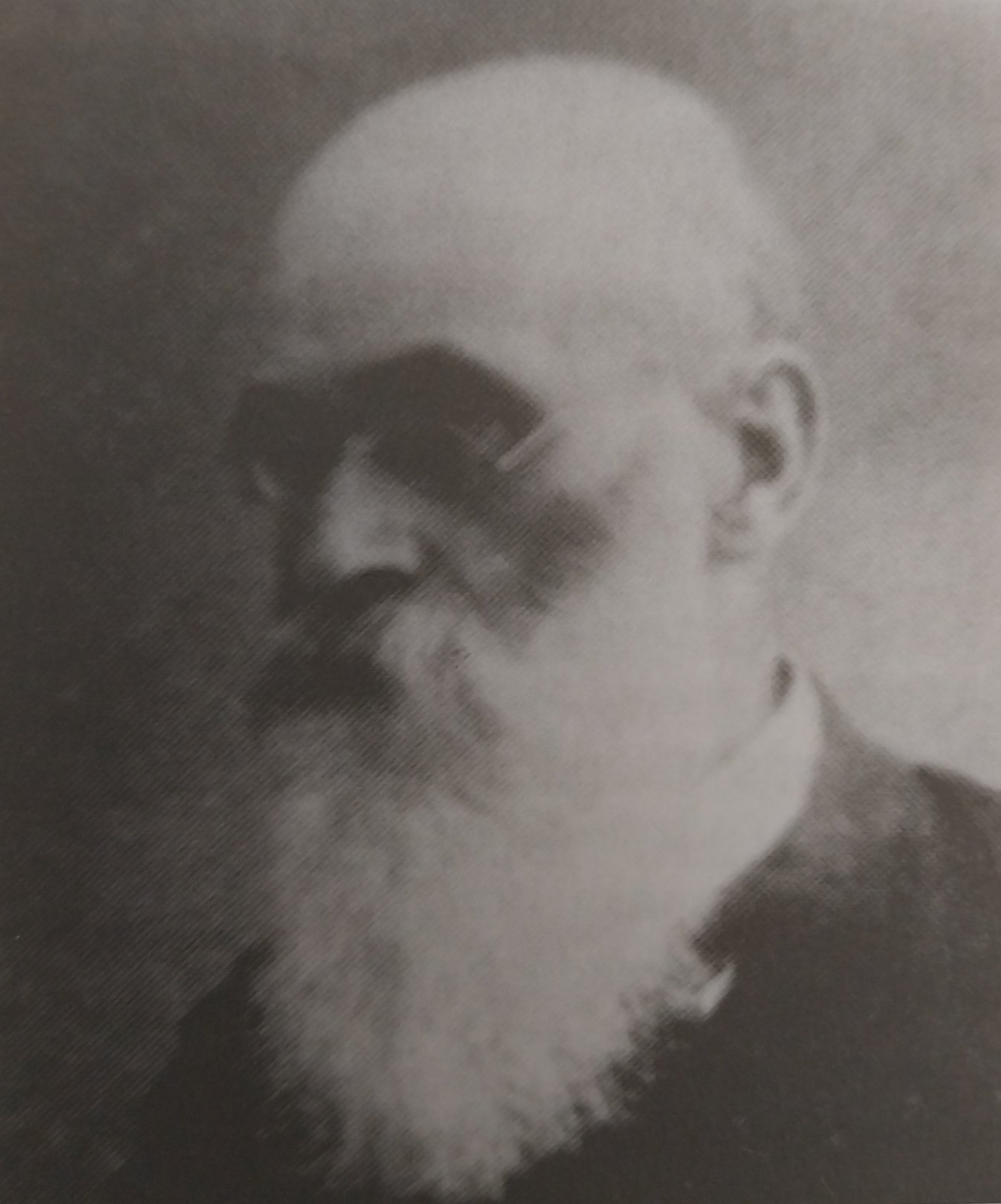
- Born: 1853; Ruse, Ottoman Empire
- Died: 10 September 1931 (aged 77–78); Sarajevo, Kingdom of Yugoslavia
- Occupations: Journalist; editor; publisher

Abraham A. Cappon (1853 – 10 September 1931), Bosnian journalist, educator and editor of La Alborada, the first Jewish newspaper in Bosnia and Herzegovina.

== Biography ==
He was born in Ruse in 1853. He lived in Ruse, Nikopol, Pleven, Sofia, Varna, Istanbul, Ploiești and Sarajevo. He was a rabbi, cantor, banker, merchant, poet, playwright, founder and editor of the newspaper La Alborado. La Alborado began to be published in 1898 in Ploiești, it was printed in Ruse. It was distributed in Romania and Serbia, to Sephardic communities that lived in isolation from the outside environment, but maintained the unity of the Sephardic cultural space despite the boundaries that the outside environment imposed on them.

From Romania Cappon moved to Sarajevo on May 12, 1900. In same year in Sarajevo he starded La Alborado as Jewish newspaper of Bosnia and Herzegovina. He played a crucial role in encouraging Zeki Effendi to start researching the history of Bosnian Jews for the newspaper La Alborado. Namely, he was not able, but he recognized the enormous experience of Zeki Effendi and simply dragged him into this research adventure.

He died in Sarajevo on September 21, 1930.
