= Bosnische Post =

Newspaper published in Bosnia and Herzegovina

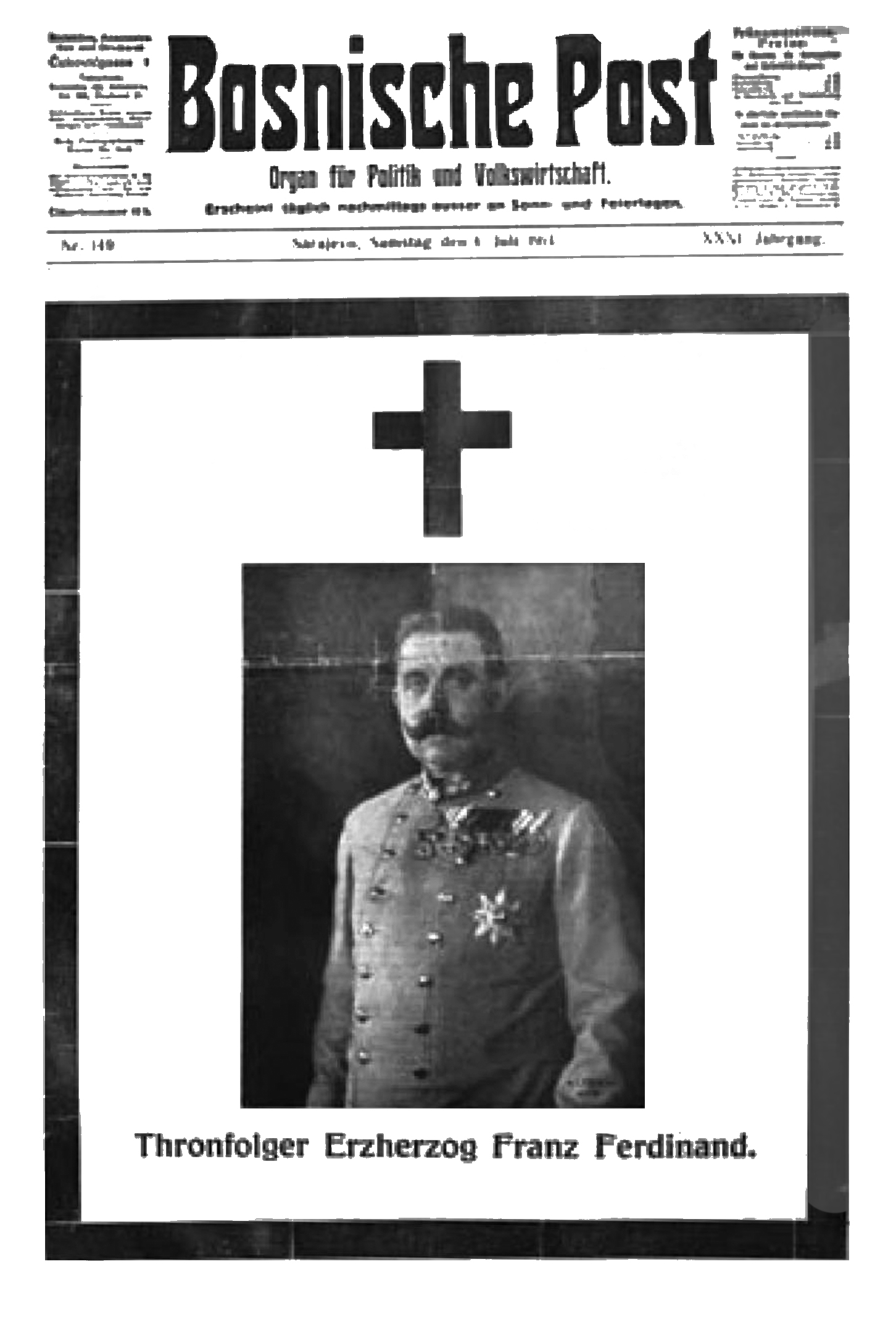
- Archduke Franz Ferdinand death notice on the 4 July 1914 front page
- Type: Weekly, later daily newspaper
- Founded: 1884
- Ceased publication: 1918
- Political alignment: pro-Austrian
- Language: German
- Country: Bosnia and Herzegovina

The Bosnische Post (lit. 'Bosnian Post') was a German-language daily newspaper in Bosnia and Herzegovina, published in Sarajevo from 1884 till 1918.

== History ==
The Bosnische Post catered for the German-language administrative and business community living in Bosnia and Herzegovina during the 40 years of Austrian rule in Bosnia and Herzegovina. These included rural colonists as well as soldiers, merchants, skilled workers, experts and civil servants, which often had Slavic roots and used German as lingua franca. This population made up up to one third of the population of Sarajevo in 1910.

The history of the Bosnische Post is strictly related to the Austrian policy in Bosnia and Herzegovina – first under the administration of Benjamin Kállay from its foundation till 1903, then under the "new course" imposed by his successor István Burián.

The Bosnische Post was founded by Julius Makanec from Zagreb, who came to Sarajevo in 1879 as a 27-year-old doctor. In December 1883, Makanec obtained a licence to found a German-language newspaper for an audience of civil servants and merchants (the so-called Kuferaši). The first issue of the Bosnische Post appeared on 3 January 1884 with Makanec as the publisher and Eugen Ritter von Toepffer, from Vienna, as the editor. The aim of the newspaper was meant to be familising the “broader circles of the monarchy with the relationships, requirements and achievements” in “New Austria” and to strengthen the “feeling of belonging”, including by providing “safe refuge” to “our Muslim brothers” and ensure their continued existence and development in Bosnia and Herzegovina. The newspaper thus, since the start, advocated a pro-Bosnian agenda, rather than a pro-Croat one.

In May 1884 the newspaper opened its own printing house, “Spindler und Löschner”, the first private printing company founded in Sarajevo, which proved pivotal for its commercial viability. As of late 1884, the Austrian administration of Bosnia and Herzegovina decided to cover from the public budget half of the total costs of the newspaper. Despite its reputation as a pro-governmental publication, the Bosnische Post claimed to retain objectivity. Makanec was also one of the initiators, together with Konstantin Hörmann and Mehmed Kapetanović, of the Sarajevo Museums Association, which in 1888 led to the foundation of the Landesmuseum, the National Museum of Bosnia and Herzegovina.

Two years after its foundation, in 1886, the Bosnische Post was bought by Eugen von Toepfer, who bequeathed it to his fiancée Milena Mrazović upon dying in 1889. Mrazović was authorised by the Austrian administration to continue publishing the newspaper, making her the first female editor-in-chief and publisher in Bosnia-Herzegovina, as well as the first professional journalist in the province. Despite the government's concession, Mrazović refused to bow to the government's will in her articles. The government commissioner for Sarajevo, Lothar Berks, described Mrazović as an "unbearable, quarrelsome, scheming woman, who is under the influence of hideous delusions and is usually in a more or less hysterical condition, regarding the manifold, sometimes crucial, questions involved in important matters of state." The government was eager to see her sell the newspaper to someone malleable. In 1893–94, Mrazović built an apartment block with newspaper offices and a printing shop on the ground floor in Cukovicgasse (today's Muvekita street). Two years later, she sold the Bosnische Post, as well as the printing and publishing business.

== Bibliography ==
- Carl Bethke, "Bosnische Post – Newspaper in Sarajevo (1884–1903)", in: Markian Prokopovych, Carl Bethke, Tamara Scheer, Language Diversity in the Late Habsburg Empire
- Mary Sparks, The Development of Austro-Hungarian Sarajevo, 1878–1918: An Urban History
