= Laura Papo Bohoreta =

Bosnian feminist, writer, and translator

Laura Papo
- לָאוּרָה פָּאפּוֹ
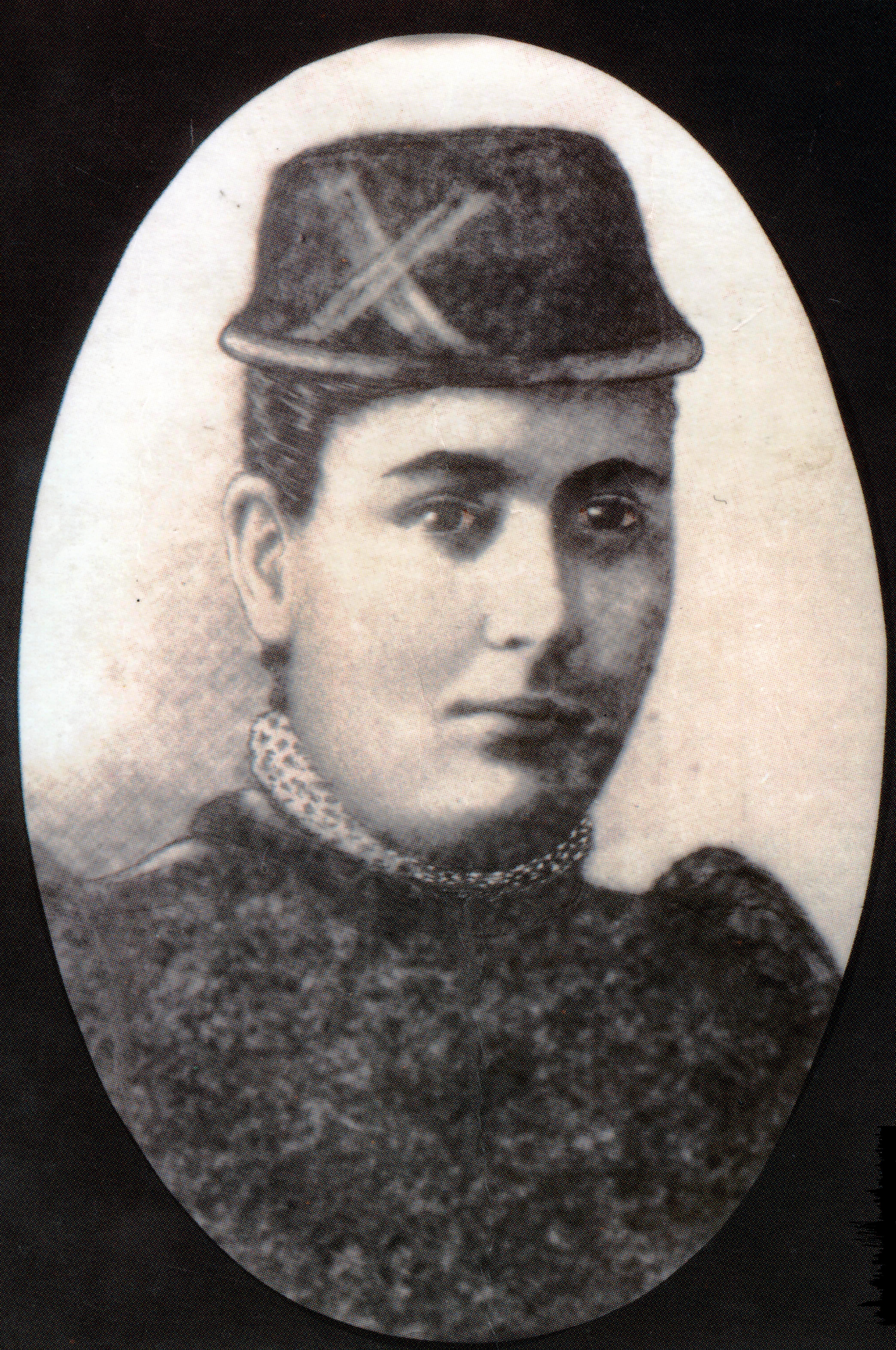
- Born: Luna Levi; 15 March 1891; Sarajevo, Condominium of Bosnia and Herzegovina, Austria-Hungary
- Died: 12 June 1942 (aged 51); Sarajevo, Independent State of Croatia
- Other name: Bohoreta
- Partner: Daniel Papo (m. 1916)
- Children: 2
- Relatives: Gordana Kuić (niece)

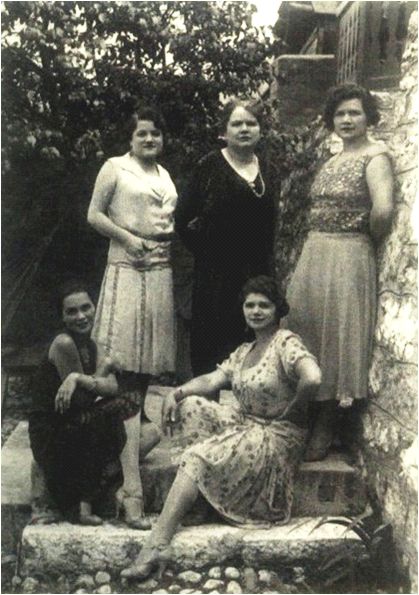
The Levi sisters.

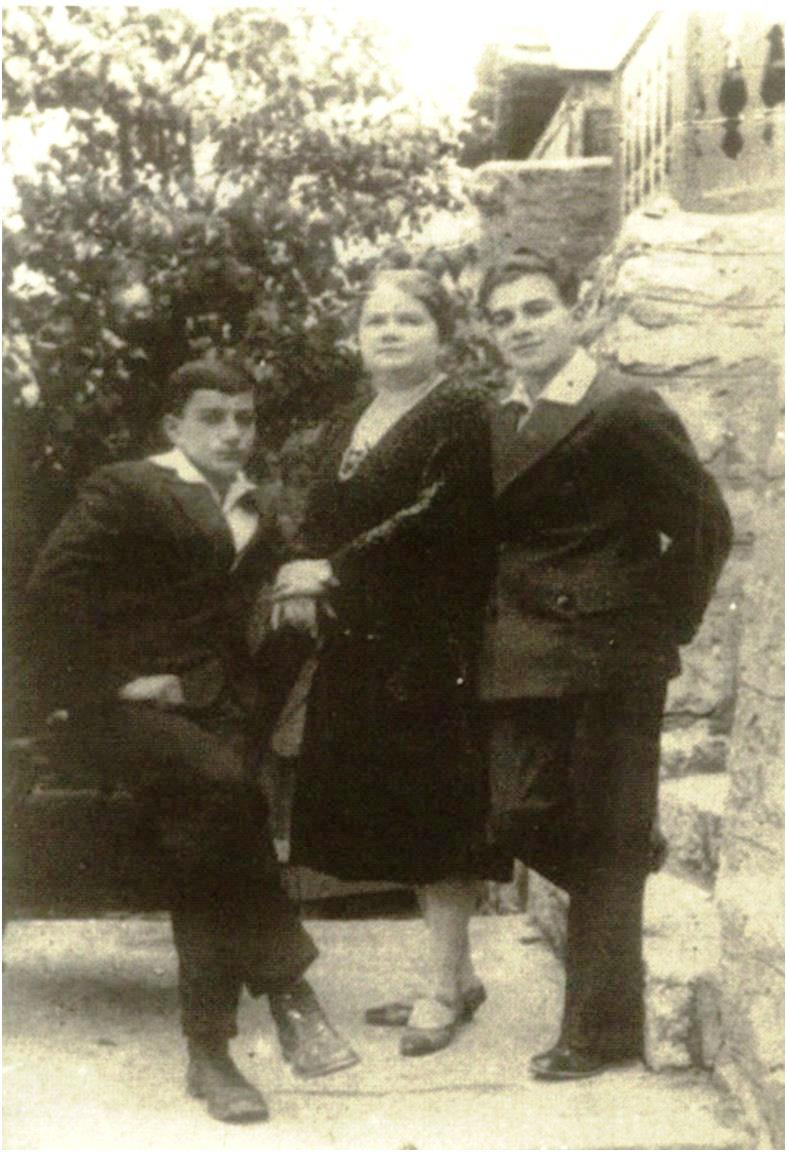
Laura Papo with her sons.

Laura Papo (Ladino: לָאוּרָה פָּאפּוֹ; born Luna Levi; 15 March 1891–1942) also known by her pseudonym Bohoreta, was a Bosnian feminist, writer, and translator who devoted her research to the condition of Sephardic women in Bosnia and Herzegovina. She is considered the first Bosnian feminist, and the first in the entire Balkans.

== Biography ==
=== Family and early life ===
Laura Papo Bohoreta was born in Sarajevo on March 15, 1891, into the poor Jewish family of Juda and Esther Levi. She was the first of the couple's seven children. Juda Levi was a trader who, having yet to succeed in Sarajevo, relocated his family to Istanbul in 1900. Laura was originally named Luna, but the family changed her name to Laura when they moved to Turkey because it was considered a more modern and international name. Laura attended the International French School for Jews, "Alliance Israélite Française," in Istanbul for eight years. After eight years, Levi's family returned to Sarajevo, just as poor as before, only with more children. To help her family, Laura gave lessons in French, Latin, and German, as well as piano lessons. With Laura's help, her sisters Nina, Klara, and Blanka (the mother of the famous writer Gordana Kuić) opened a salon called "Chapeau Chic Parisien" in Sarajevo. Immediately upon returning to Sarajevo at 17, Laura began losing interest in the Sephardi tradition and folklore, instead turning her attention to collecting romance poems, stories, and Sephardic proverbs. Additionally, she translated and adapted the works of French authors: Jules Verne's "Captain Grant's Children" and Emile de Girardin's "Joy of Fears" ("La joie fait peur – Alegria espanta").

=== Marriage and family issues ===
In 1916, Laura married Daniel Papo. Leon, their first son, was born in 1918, followed by Bar-Kohbu and Kokija a year later. Unfortunately, the marriage did not last long after Daniel suffered from severe mental illness (most likely from PTSD, as he had participated as a soldier in the First World War) and was permanently placed in a psychiatric institution. Laura, at age 28, remained single with two young children. For the next few years, she was not socially engaged, spending her time working and taking care of her sons.

After committing her husband to a psychiatric institution, she did not lose her faith in life. She worked, wrote, collected folklore material, supported local women, and motivated them to be wives, have children, and respect the customs of their mothers and grandmothers while being aware of the age in which they live and adapting to it. Laura was not a feminist in the sense of advocating for equal rights for men and women; she believed in awakening a woman's awareness of her power, endurance, and perseverance in achieving all her goals. Laura believed that the development of women should not depend on their environment but on themselves and on their desire to progress.

Laura Papo wrote and performed a sketch called "Preparations for Passover" with her sisters on the evening of the Jewish community of Wesko in 1919. Following the success of the performance, the representatives of the La Benevolencija Association of the Sarajevo community convinced Papo to write a skit for an evening organized by the association. This began her theatrical career among the Jewish community in Sarajevo.

=== World War II and death ===
In 1941, at the very beginning of the World War II and the Holocaust, both her sons were taken by the Ustashas to the Jasenovac concentration camp. Heartbroken, Laura fell ill and died in 1942 at the Sisters of Mercy Hospital in Sarajevo. She was not informed of her sons' deaths at the hands of the Ustashas on the way to Jasenovac.

== Writing career ==
=== "Die Spanolische" (1916) ===
Laura published the article "South Slav Women in Politics" ("Die Südslawische Frau in der Politik"), in 1916 in the Bosnische Post, a Bosnian-Herzegovinian newspaper printed in German, where Jelica Belović-Bernadzikowska dedicated a chapter to Sephardic women in Bosnia and Herzegovina. In this article, the Sephardic woman was described as a nun, which is a traditional way to show that a woman is loyal and upholds patriarchal values. This angered Laura, and she published the answer, "Die Spanolische," a week later in the same newspaper, with the intention of a more realistic presentation of the Sephardic woman, her role in the family, and her virtues, and defects.

=== "Madras" (1924) ===
Laura re-entered social engagements in 1924 in response to the nostalgic story of Avram Romano Buki's "The Two Neighbors in the Courtyard" ("Dos vizinas in el cortijo"), published in the journal Jevrejski život (Jewish Life). Avram Romano Buki had written the story of a conversation between two neighbors, Lea and Bohoreta. Neighbors talk casually about everyday events, acquaintances, and friends. Laura was especially angry that one of the neighbors, Lea, claimed that schools were ruining young women, because they want to educate themselves and no longer want to iron, to cook, to wash clothes, to sew, nor to 'tingle' their husbands.

In the next issue of the same magazine, Laura published the article "Mothers" ("Madras") and signed it with the pseudonym Bohoreta. In this article, she sharply criticized Buki and his conservatism. She wrote for the first time in the Judaeo-Spanish language (also known as Ladino). According to Eliezer Papo, she chose the pseudonym of Bohoreta to identify the readers with the person described in Buki's story. She remained faithful to the ideas that women must be educated, and not deal only with housework, because they must adapt to the current and future situation in which a woman will have to work to survive. She sourced her ideas from the article called "Mothers." Laura could raise her children due to her education.

Later, she published in the same newspaper the novel Morena ("Brunette").

=== "La mužer sefardi de Bosna" (1931) and other dramas of the 1930s ===
In 1931, upon the encouragement of Vite Kajon, a great Yugoslav and Sarajevo intellectual writer, she wrote the monograph "The Sephardic Woman in Bosnia" (La mužer sefardi de Bosna), based on the 1916 article by Bernadzikowska-Belovic, later translated into Bosnian by late professor Muhamed Nezirović ("Sefardska žena u Bosni"). In her book, Laura detailed the customs, the way of dressing, cooking, virtue, and the defect of the Sephardic woman, emphasizing traditional values that should not be forgotten, but at the same time encouraging women to adapt to the current situation and to accept the demands the modern society places on them.

During the 1930s, Laura wrote seven dramas: the single-act "Sometimes" (Avia de ser), "Patience of the Couples Worth" (La pasjensija vale mučo), "Past times" (Tjempos pasados), the drama in three acts "My Eyes" (Ožos mios), and three drama of social content in three acts "The Mother and the Blind of Good" (Esterka, Shuegra ni de baro buena) and "The Brotherhood of the Stepmother, the Name Speaks Enough "(Hermandat Madrasta el nombre le abasta).

Laura Papo wrote in Judaeo-Spanish when the language was declining. She renewed and adapted expressions to the spirit of the time and succeeded in her writings to establish a connection between the young people of the community and the language in which their forefathers spoke. Papo collaborated with the youth theatre group of the Sarajevo community, Matathias, which performed her plays. In this, she argued, she was struggling with "linguistic assimilation". Her writings were written in three languages. In general, her publications, articles, and plays for the local audience were in Serbo-Croatian with elements of Castilian, which helped to spread her works. In her personal writings, Papo wrote in mixed Castilian and Serbo-Croatian, but wrote in Castilian in her formal writings for foreigners.

She intended to teach women through familiar and frequent situations in each family, such as how to live, how to overcome current problems and meet the needs of both the family and society. Every woman can be a mother and work outside the home, without the bother of conscience, while respecting the Sephardic tradition. It should be kept in mind the fact that Laura lived in the Balkans in the period before, during, and after the First World War, and between the two wars, during the Great Depression and the fascist persecution of the Jews.

== See also ==
- The Scent of Rain in the Balkans, a novel by her niece Gordana Kuić dedicated to Laura Papo's history
- History of the Jews in Bosnia and Herzegovina
