= The Scent of Rain in the Balkans =

1986 novel by Gordana Kuić

- Author: Gordana Kuić
- Language: Serbian; Ladino
- Genre: Historical
- Publisher: 1986 {Vuk Karadžić Books}
- Publication place: Yugoslavia
- Media type: Print, paper cover
- Pages: 506 pp
- ISBN: 978-86-7710-423-8
- OCLC: 69173162
- Followed by: The Blossom of Linden in the Balkans

The Scent of Rain in the Balkans (Serbian: Мирис кише на Балкану, Miris Kiše na Balkanu) is a historical novel written by Gordana Kuić. The novel was published in 1986, becoming an instant bestseller. It centers on the Salom family, most notably five sisters — Buka, Nina, Klara, Blanki and Riki. The novel was inspired by Kuić's mother Blanki Levi and her sisters. The Scent of Rain in the Balkans follows the destinies of, not only Jews, but also Orthodox, Bosniaks and Catholics during two major historical events — World War I and World War II.

In his review of the novel, David Albahari wrote:

The Scent of Rain in the Balkans possesses all the characteristics of a good book. In her attempt to show the destiny of a Jewish family living on Bosnian soil, the author has gone much further: she shows that the inevitability of historical developments is inescapable; she paints history as a monster who continually returns in cycles, but also as a mad joker who is ready to change the colors at any moment. The novel is also a document of a world that no longer exists – the world of the Sephardic Jews of Sarajevo. Therefore, this novel is an important contribution to the rather meager Jewish literary output in Serbia, but grows beyond the boundaries of such a definition and undoubtedly takes a more general significance.

The Scent of Rain in the Balkans has been adapted into a ballet, a play and a television series.

== Plot ==
The novel describes the historic period in the Balkans from the beginning of World War I in 1914, to the end of World War II in 1945 through the lives and destinies of the Saloms, a Sephardic Jewish family from Sarajevo. The leading characters are the five courageous Salom sisters whose struggle to fulfil personal desires and aspirations run contrary to the strict conventions of the multicultural and religious societies — Bosnian Jew, Muslim, Orthodox and Catholic — of the time, living side by side in the small town of Sarajevo.

== Characters ==
=== The Salom family ===
- Leon Salom, the father of the family
- Estera Salom, the mother of the family
- Laura "Buka" Salom, later Laura Papo, the eldest daughter of Leon and Estera
- Nina Salom, later Nina Ignjatić, the second daughter of Leon and Estera
- Klara Salom, later Klara Valić, the third daughter of Leon and Estera
- Isak "Atleta" Salom, the eldest son of Leon and Estera
- Blanka "Blanki" Salom, later Branka Korać, the fourth daughter of Leon and Estera
- Rifketa "Riki" Salom, the fifth and the youngest daughter of Leon and Estera, who becomes a successful ballerina
- Elijas Salom, the second son and the youngest child of Leon and Estera
- Nona Salom, one of the aunts of the Salom children and a highly respected member of the family

=== Serbian characters ===
- Marko Korać, a Mostar–born Blanki's childhood crush and eventually her husband
- Škoro "Ignjo" Ignjatić, Danijel's friend and Nina's husband
- Miloš Ranković, Riki's mentor and lover for a while
- Dušan, a journalist from Belgrade who fancies Riki
- Sanda Jovanović, Riki's friend from Belgrade of Jewish heritage
- Nena Ranković, Miloš's wife
- Vlada Stefanović, a teacher in the village where Riki hides
- Danica Stefanović, Vlada's wife
- Vera Korać, Blanki and Marko's daughter
- Risto Korać, one of Marko's brothers
- Pero Korać, one of Marko's brothers
- Saveta Primorac, Marko's sister
- Jovo Primorac, Saveta's husband
- Ana Primorac, one of two Saveta and Jovo's daughters
- Jelena Primorac, one of two Saveta and Jovo's daughters
- Toma, a Serbian peasant who shelters Riki
- Spasenija, Toma's wife
- Mrs. Ninković, a frequent shopper in Nina's hat boutique who likes gossiping

=== Jewish characters ===
- Danijel Papo, Buka's husband and the father of her sons Leon and Koki
- Zdenka Vajs, an Ashkenazi Jew, Atleta's wife
- Leon Papo, Buka and Danijel's elder son, named after his maternal grandfather
- Barkohba "Koki" Papo, Buka and Danijel's younger son

=== Other characters ===
- Ivo Valić, a Catholic Croat, Klara's husband
- Didi Valić, Klara and Ivo's daughter
- Pol Valić, Klara and Ivo's son
- Cliff Morton, an American soldier and Didi's husband
- Grethen, a rich Austrian girl and Blanki's good friend from school
- Carl Raimund, the agent of a ballet school from Vienna
- Dragu, a ballet dancer and Riki's friend
- Mr. Panzini, an Italian rich man who fancies Blanki
- Sister Agata, a nun in the convent where Buka dies

== Structure and language ==
The Scent of Rain in the Balkans is written in Serbian language, with some parts in Ladino, the language of Sephardi. It is divided in thirteen parts — 28 June 1914 (28. jun 1914), A Flight to Unknown (Let u nepoznato), Linden, the Tree of Old Slavs (Lipa, drvo starih Slovena), Time for Decisions (Vreme za odluke), Toboggan (Tobogan), When a Day Turns Cold and the Shadows Are Gone (Kad zahladni dan i senke odu), The End of One Age (Kraj jednog vremena), A Critic Point (Kritična tačka), Runaways (Bežanja), Paper Jesters (Papirni pajaci), A New Life (Novi život), Lasting (Trajanje) and Epilogue (Epilog).

== Awards ==
- 1986 — Association of Jewish Communities in Yugoslavia Award for Novel of the Year

== Adaptations ==
In 1992, ballet by Croatian composer Igor Kuljerić The Scent of Rain in the Balkans – a Ballet for Riki premiered in Sarajevo, and then a week after in Belgrade. In 2009, screenwriter Nebojša Romčević wrote a stage adaptation of the novel that premiered on 12 April 2009 in the Madlenianum Opera and Theatre, starring Sloboda Mićalović and Vuk Kostić. In 2010, Ljubiša Samardžić directed the television adaptation of the novel, which was shown on the RTS.
