= Isak Samokovlija =

Bosnian writer (1889–1955)

- Isak Samokovlija, circa 1942
- Born: 3 September 1889; Goražde, Condominium of Bosnia and Herzegovina, Austro-Hungarian Empire
- Died: 15 January 1955 (aged 65); Sarajevo, SR Bosnia and Herzegovina, SFR Yugoslavia
- Education: University of Vienna
- Occupations: Writer, academic
- Spouse: Hedda Samokovlija (née Brunner)
- Writing career
- Subjects: Jewish life in Bosnia and Herzegovina

Isak Samokovlija (3 September 1889 – 15 January 1955) was a Bosnian writer. By profession he was a physician. His stories describe the life of the Bosnian Sephardic Jews.

== Biography ==
Samokovlija was born into a Sephardi Jewish family in Goražde, Bosnia and Herzegovina at the time of the Austro-Hungarian occupation. While one side of his family came from Spain after the Expulsion of Jews from Spain, "his great-grandfather moved to Bosnia from the town of Samokov in Bulgaria", which led to "the surname Los Samokovlis in Ladino or Samokovlija in Bosnian.

After completing primary school Samokovlija went to Sarajevo. He attended high school with Ivo Andrić, the first Yugoslav to win the Nobel Prize in Literature. After graduating high school in 1910, he received a scholarship from local Jewish charity La Benevolencija to study medicine in Vienna. Later he worked as a doctor in the towns Goražde and Fojnica (1921–25) before beginning a regular job at Sarajevo's Koševo hospital in 1925.

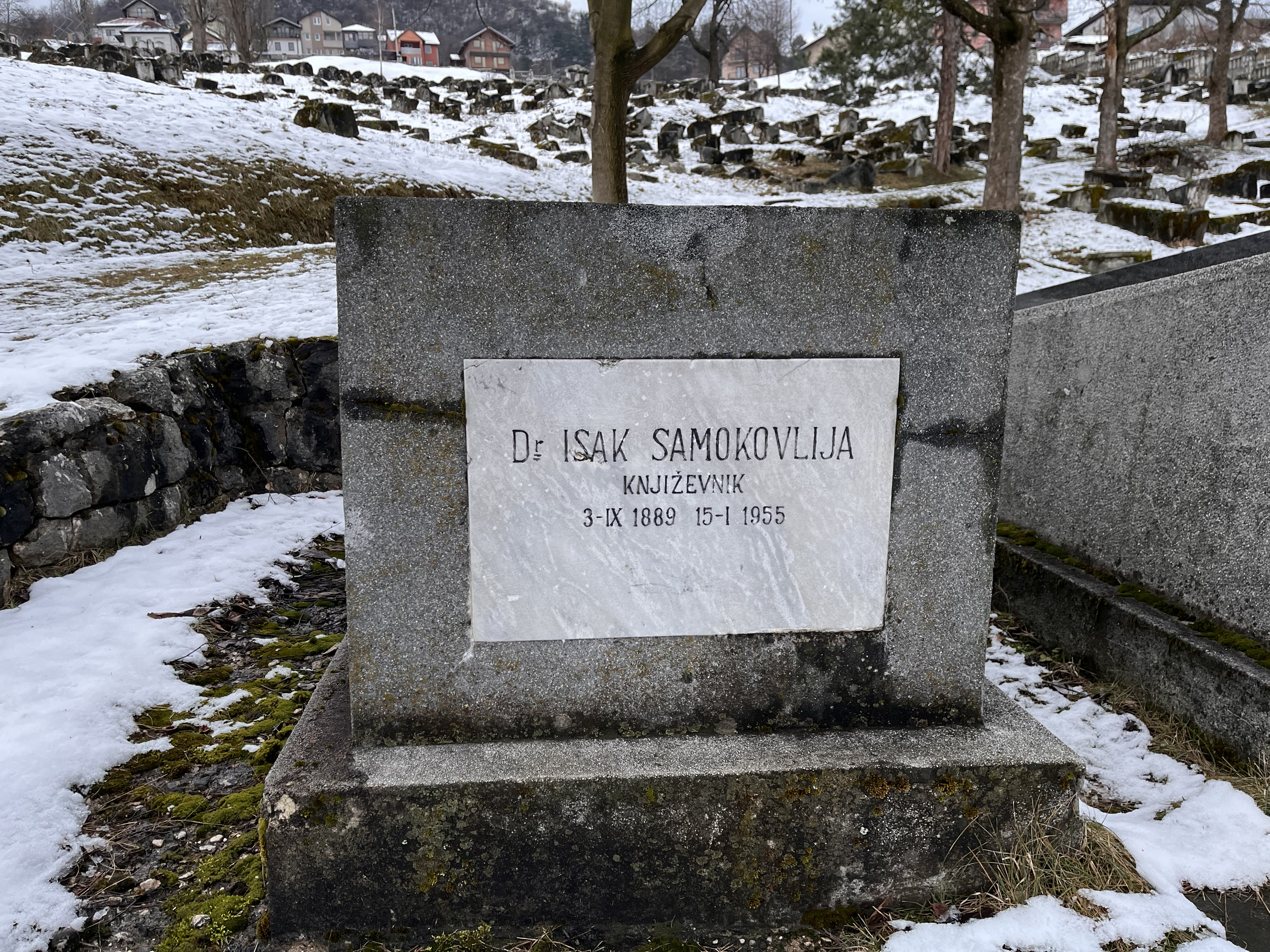
Grave of Isak Samokovlija in Sarajevo

At the beginning of the Second World War, he was a department head at the Koševo hospital. In April 1941 he was discharged from service as well as other Jews, but soon he was mobilized as a medical doctor fights against a typhus epidemic. It was not until 1945, he managed to escape Yugoslavia and hide until the country was liberated. After the end of World War II, he held various positions in the Bosnian and Yugoslav literary circles. From 1948 to 1951 he edited the magazine Brazda, and then, until his death he was an editor at the publishing company Svjetlost.

His first short story Rafina avlija was published in 1927 and two years later his first collection of stories, Od proljeća do proljeća, came out. Several of his stories were made into television films and his book Hanka was made into a film of the same name directed by Slavko Vorkapić in 1955. He did not live to see the film, dying at age 65 in January 1955. He was buried in the old Jewish cemetery on the slopes of Trebević mountain, near Sarajevo.

== Bibliography ==
- Rafina avlija (1927, Rafo's Yard)
- Od proljeća do proljeća (1929, From Spring to Spring)
- Nosač Samuel, (1946, Samuel the Porter)
- Solomunovo slovo, (1949, Solomun's Letter)
- Hanka (Hanka)
- Plava Jevrejka (The Blond Jewess)
- On je lud (He is Crazy)
- Fuzija (Fusion)
- Tragom života (Following Life)
- Đerdan (The Necklace)
- Priča o radostima (A Story of Joy)
