= Gordana Kuić =

Serbian novelist (1942–2023)

- Гордана Куић
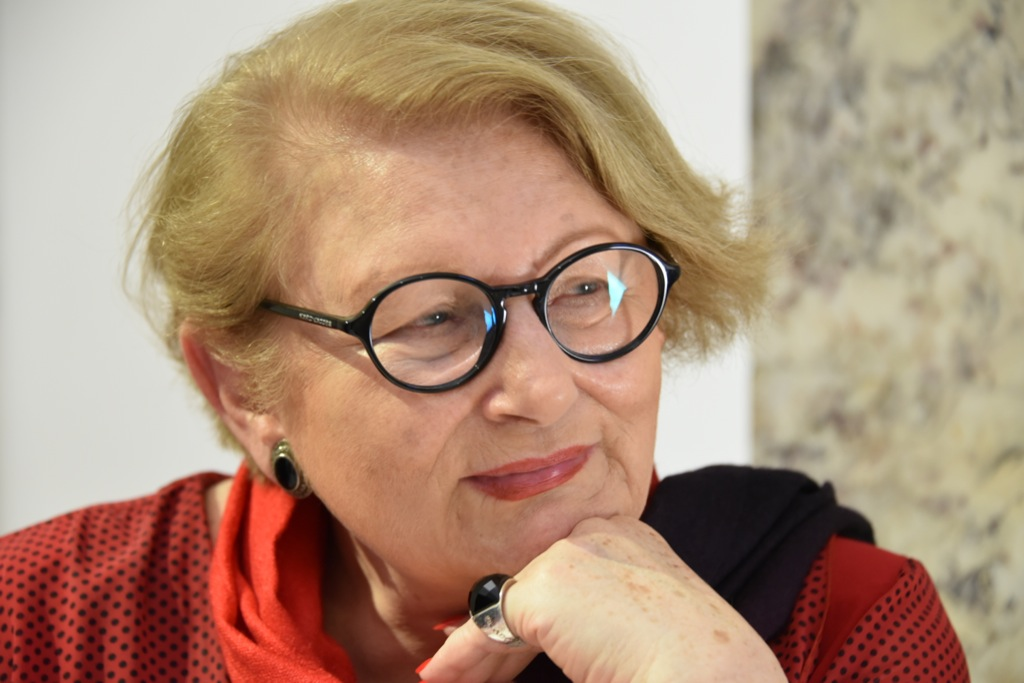
- Kuić in 2015
- Born: 29 August 1942; Belgrade, German-occupied Serbia
- Died: 13 January 2023 (aged 80); Belgrade, Serbia
- Occupation: Novelist
- Relatives: Laura Papo Bohoreta (aunt)
- Writing career
- Genre: Contemporary
- Notable work: The Scent of Rain in the Balkans

Gordana Kuić (Serbian Cyrillic: Гордана Куић, pronounced [ɡǒrdana kǔːit͜ɕ]; 29 August 1942 – 13 January 2023) was a Serbian novelist.

== Biography ==
Kuić was born on 29 August 1942. She was the winner of numerous literature awards in the countries that made up former Yugoslavia. Her work has been mainly inspired by her mother Blanka Levi and her aunts, such as Laura Papo Bohoreta, to whom she dedicated two novels, who were Sephardi Jews. Kuić is probably best known for her first novel The Scent of Rain in the Balkans, an unexpected hit initially published by the Jewish community imprint in Belgrade in 1986. The book was subsequently made into a ballet, a theatre play and television series.

Kuić died on 13 January 2023, at the age of 80 in Belgrade.

== Bibliography ==
=== Novels ===
- The Scent of Rain in the Balkans (Miris kiše na Balkanu)
- The Blossom of Linden in the Balkans (Cvat lipe na Balkanu)
- Twilight in the Balkans (Smiraj dana na Balkanu)
- Ghosts over the Balkans (Duhovi nad Balkanom)
- The Legend of Luna Levi (Legenda o Luni Levi)
- The Fairytale of Benjamin Baruh (Bajka o Benjaminu Baruhu)
- The Ballad of Bohoreta (Balada o Bohoreti)

=== Other work ===
- Remnants (Preostale priče) — stories
- On the Other Side of the Night (S druge strane noći) - stories
