= Jewish Municipality of Sarajevo =

Religious organisation in Bosnia and Herzegovina

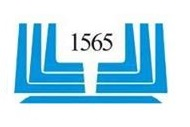
- Founded: 1565
- Location: Sarajevo, Bosnia and Herzegovina

The Jewish Municipality of Sarajevo, also the Jewish community of Sarajevo, is a religious organization of citizens of Bosnia and Herzegovina of Jewish origin. The seat of the municipality is in Sarajevo.

== History ==
The history of Jewish immigration to Bosnia and Herzegovina and Sarajevo began in 1492 after the Spanish Catholic royal couple Ferdinand and Isabella managed to break the power of the Muslim rulers in the area of present-day Spain. For the remaining citizens of the Muslim and Jewish faiths, a time of discrimination and pressure to accept Christianity or leave has begun. At that moment, the Ottoman government allowed Jewish exiles from Spain to settle in their territory.

=== Jewish Municipality of Sarajevo ===
Around 1551, the first Jewish families moved to Sarajevo, and as early as 1565, a Jewish (Sephardic) municipality was founded in Sarajevo. At the request of Sarajevo's Muslim leaders, Kanijeli Siyavuş Pasha, when he arrived in Sarajevo in 1581, had a large inn built as apartments for Jews, in order to live as a special people in the city. However, the Ottoman government did not impose on the Jews the ghetto provisions first established by the Christian rulers. Siyavuş Pasha managed to get permission from the sultan for the Jews of Sarajevo to build their own synagogue.

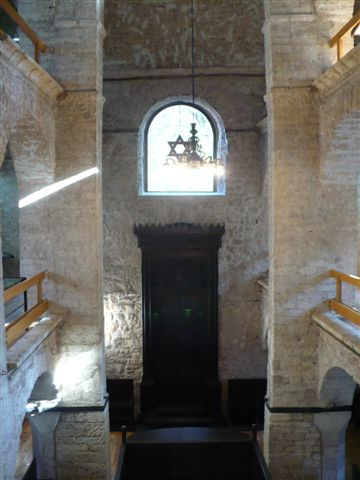
The interior of Old Temple in Sarajevo

Rabbi Samuel Baruch, born in Thessaloniki, served as a rabbi among Sarajevo Jews from 1623 to 1649. He is considered the first rabbi in Sarajevo. During his time, the Jewish cemetery was built, where the tomb of Samuel Baruch is preserved to this day. When the Austrian general Eugene of Savoy entered Sarajevo with his army in 1697, he had burned down entire city and the oldest registry books of the Jews were lost. In 1731, the Jewish Municipality in Sarajevo inaugurated its oldest surviving Statute, and Rabbi David Pardo already founded a Jewish theological school, or yeshiva, in Sarajevo in 1768, which was colloquially known as the Yeshiva. Three years later, he founded such a school for the Jews of Travnik. The service of rabbi from 1815 to 1830 was performed by Rabbi Moše Danon, who went to Palestine with the intention of dying there but died on the way in Stolac, where the Jews of Bosnia and Herzegovina still make pilgrimages to his grave. With the arrival of Austria-Hungary in 1878, citizens of the Jewish faith, known as Ashkenazis, began to immigrate to Sarajevo. In 1879, the Ashkenazi Jewish Municipality was founded in Sarajevo, and already in 1901, according to the project of Karel Paržik, the Ashkenazi Synagogue was built on the other side of Miljacka, which still serves as a place of worship for the Jews of Sarajevo. With the creation of Yugoslavia in 1918, the Federation of Jewish Religious Communities was founded in that country. From 1928 to 1941, Jevrejski glas was published in Sarajevo as a political, cultural and religious newspaper of the Jews. The importance of the Jewish community in Sarajevo is told by the fact that in 1923, the Union of Jewish Communities in Belgrade decided to establish the Secondary Theological Seminary in Sarajevo, because the Jewish community in Sarajevo was the oldest, had a large number of synagogues, and a Sephardic and Ashkenazi community. two additions and the most space for accommodation.

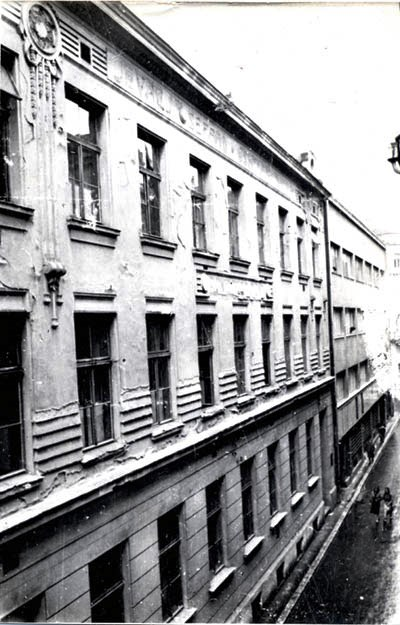
Sarajevo Rabbinic seminary

The secondary theological seminary in Sarajevo was opened in 1928, which shows that Sarajevo was the center of Jews in Yugoslavia in that period. In 1930, a new Sephardic Temple synagogue (Great New Temple) was opened in Sarajevo, at that time the largest vaulted building in the Balkans.

In April 1941, the Second World War began in Yugoslavia and Sarajevo became part of the Independent State of Croatia. The Ustaše authorities appoint Srećko Bujas to take care of the Jewish Municipality in Sarajevo. In the same month, the Temple was set on fire and looted. First, German soldiers and robbers attacked the prayer area of the Temple, knocked down a chandelier with a thousand candles, threw relics on the floor, trampled the books of Moses, tore cloths with knives, fought each other over gold and silver, rolled off the copper covering from the dome, threw furniture from the office. And then, tired and convinced that they had taken everything that could be taken, they left in the late afternoon. Passers-by looked away, bowed their heads and hurried away. While all this was happening, Moric Papo, the secretary of the Jewish Municipality in Sarajevo, Moric Daniti, the courier, and Albert Finci were standing on the opposite side of the street. They stood and watched helplessly. When they were sure that the German soldiers and looters had left, they headed to the devastated Temple. The courier Daniti loaded all the books on a cart and took them to a private apartment. Later, the registers were entrusted to religious teacher Jakov Maestro, and Pinkas, the newer one from 1925, and the old one from 1720 to Finci, who placed them in a safe. After that, a German officer came and asked for Pinkas. ↓1 When they were handed over to him, he took the smaller one, from 1720, and put it in his purse. He did not leave a reverse. It is not known who the German officer was, nor has it ever been determined who it was. After the Second World War, many people tried to find that Pinkas. Rumor has it that it could be in an Austrian library or somewhere in Germany, perhaps in Leipzig.

In the same year (1941), Jews were ordered to wear the yellow star, and then deportations to forced labor were organized. Close to 5,000 Jews were deported to the camps, although some prominent citizens of Sarajevo protested about it. During 1942, the largest number of Jews were deported to Jasenovac and Auschwitz camps. According to the 1926 census, there were 13,643 Jews in Bosnia and Herzegovina. After the Second World War, in 1945 there were only 1,292 people of Jewish origin in Bosnia and Herzegovina. In 1946, the Sephardi and Ashkenazi Jewish municipalities were united into one Jewish municipality in Sarajevo. Jews who survived the Second World War remained in Bosnia and Herzegovina. In SFR Yugoslavia, the Jewish community got a chance to recover again, so after the war, most Jews married outside their ethnic group. Because of this, many Serbs, Croats and Bosniaks assimilated into the Jewish community. These intermarriages proved important in Sarajevo during the war in Bosnia and Herzegovina, as the Jewish community of about 2,000 people was the only one equally connected to the three warring parties.

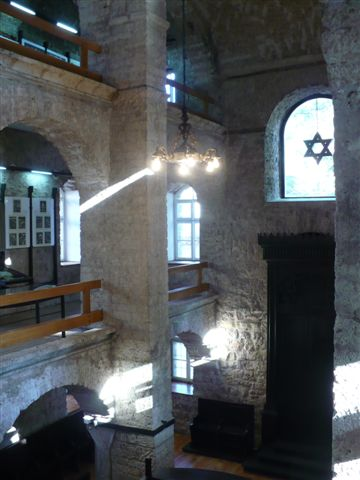
The interior of Old Temple in Sarajevo

In 1966, many events in Sarajevo marked the 400th anniversary of the arrival of Jews in Bosnia and Herzegovina. The oldest synagogue, Il Kal Grandi, was adapted into the Museum of the Jews of Bosnia and Herzegovina, and on the remains of the Sephardic Temple, the "Workers' University Đuro Đaković" (today the Bosnian Cultural Center) was built, in the foyer of which a memorial Menorah was placed, commemorating the 400 years since arrival of Jews in Bosnia and Herzegovina. In the same year, an extensive adaptation of the Ashkenazi synagogue in Sarajevo was carried out, which was structurally arranged so that its upper part retained the function of the synagogue temple, while the lower area was arranged into office and work rooms, and two large functional halls for social, cultural and entertainment content. and for the gathering of members and friends of the Jewish Municipality. Just two years later (1968), Menachem Avram Romano, the last Sarajevo rabbi, died.

In 1992, the 500th anniversary of the expulsion of the Jews from Spain was marked in Sarajevo with a multi-day cultural event Sefarad 92. In the same year, at the beginning of the war in Bosnia and Herzegovina, the Jewish Municipality in Sarajevo organized the procurement of food, medicine and all kinds of aid, as well as several convoys with Sarajevo citizens fleeing the besieged city. After the war in Bosnia and Herzegovina, the Jewish Municipality in Sarajevo continues to operate. Today, it has its own pharmacy and kitchen, which are available to the membership. Many cultural manifestations are constantly held, and several important publications are published.

== Sarajevo rabbis ==
Rabbis of the Sephardic Jewish Municipality of Sarajevo
#	Title	Name and surname	Mandate started	Mandate completed	Note
1.	rabbi	Samuel Baruh	1623	1640	
2.	rabbi	Haham Cevi Hirš zv. Aškenazi	1686	1689	
3.	rabbi	Haham Isak Cevi	1691	1716	
4.	chief rabbi	Šem - Tov Cevi	1716	1732	
5.	rabbi	Josef Nakazi Avram Mačoro	1732	?	
6	chief rabbi	Jakob Pardo zv. Moreno	1768	1781	
7.	rabbi	Isak Pardo	1781	1810	
8	chief rabbi	Moše Danon	1815	1830	
9.	rabbi	Meir Mehanem Danon	1830	1839	
10.	chief rabbi	Moše Perera	1839	1849	
11.	chief rabbi	Benjamin Danon	1849	1852	
12.	rabbi rabbi rabbi	Jichako Levi Cadik Danon Avram Levi	1852	1856	Bet-Din ↓2
13.	chief rabbi	Šimon Hason	1856	1858	
14.	chief rabbi	Avram Levi	1858	1868	
15.	rabbi rabbi rabbi	Bencion Pinto Eliezer Šemtov Papo Juda Josef Finci	1868	1884	Bet-Din
16.	chief rabbi	Juda Josef Finci	1884	1887	
17.	chief rabbi	Avram Abinun	1887	1902	
18.	rabbi rabbi rabbi	Avram J. Romano zv. Merkado Moše Maestro Jošua Salom	1902	1916	Bet-Din
19.	chief rabbi	Moric Levi	1916	1942	

Rabbis of the Ashkenazi Jewish Municipality of Sarajevo
#	Title	Name and surname	Mandat započeo	Mandat završen	Note
1.	rabbi	Berhnard Buchvald	1885	1896	
2.	rabbi	N. Funk	1896	1898	
3.	chief rabbi	Samuel Vesel	1898	1928	rabbi (1989. – 1902.) chief rabbi (1902-1928)
4.	chief rabbi	Hinko Urbah	1928	1946	

Rabbis of the Jewish Municipality of Sarajevo
#	Title	Name and surname	Mandat započeo	Mandat završen	Note
1.	chief rabbi	Menahem Avram Romano	1946	1968	
2.	chief rabbi	Cadik Danon	1972	1992	
3.	rabbi	Eliezer Papo	1992	2024	non-resident

== Sarajevo synagogues ==
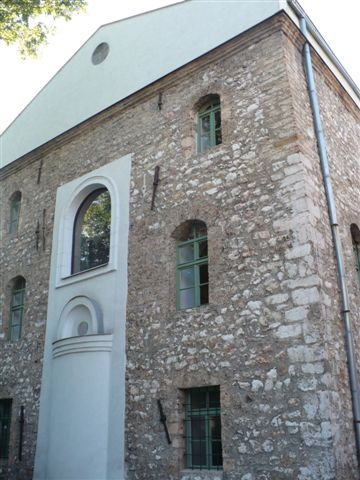
Il Kal Vježu or Old Temple, today the Jewish Museum of Bosnia and Herzegovina

During several centuries of living in Sarajevo, Jews made a great contribution to the development of the city. At the beginning of the war in Bosnia and Herzegovina in 1992–1995. year, most of Sarajevo's Jews were evacuated from the occupied city. Those who remained shared the fate of other citizens and provided great help to their fellow citizens through the activities of the society La Benevolencija. Sarajevo had a large number of Jewish religious buildings.

=== Il Kal Vježu ===
Il Kal Vježu or the Old Temple is the first synagogue in Sarajevo built in 1581. It is also known as the Old Synagogue, Sijavuš Pasha's Daira, Kortiž, Kortižiko, Kurtižiko, and Čifuthana. The synagogue was destroyed by fire several times, especially in 1778. It was renovated in 1821 and adapted in 1909. During the Second World War, it served as a prison for Jews, before being sent to the camps. After the war, it was restored as the Museum of the Jews of Bosnia and Herzegovina.

=== Il Kal Nuevu ===
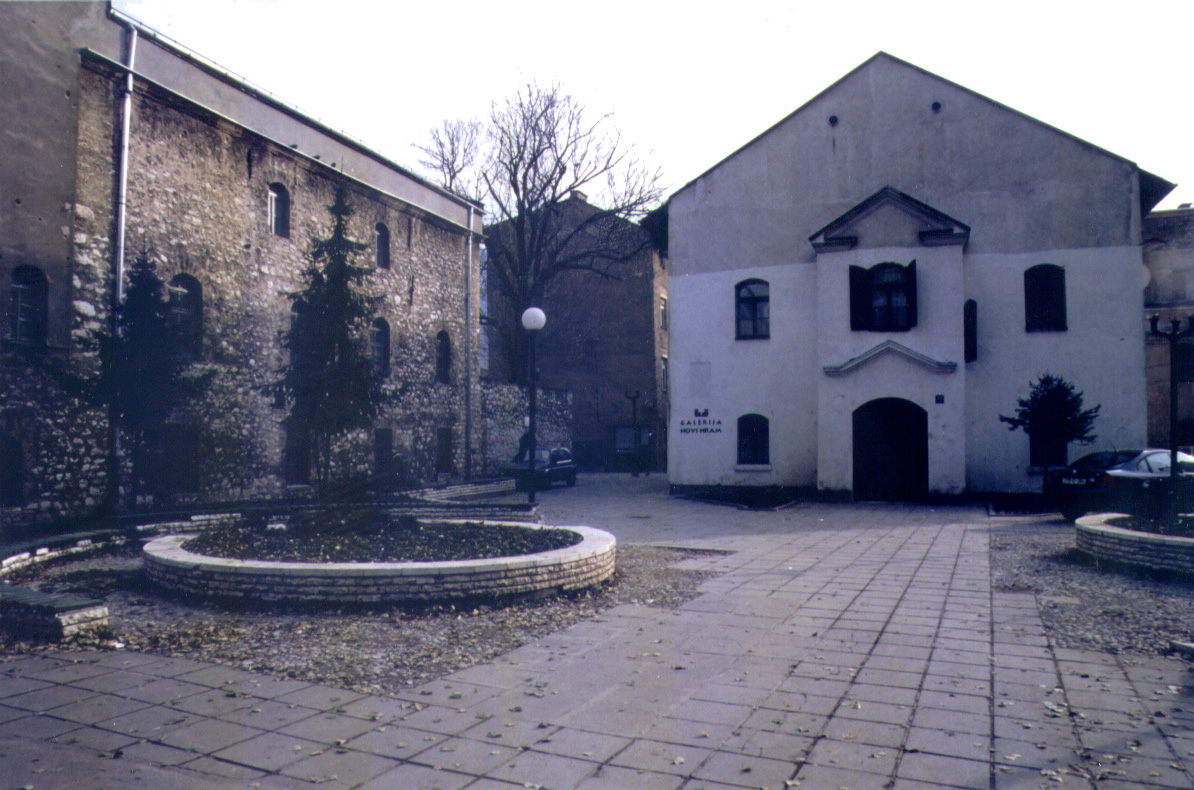
Il Kal Nuevu, or New Temple, today the New Temple Gallery, with the Old Temple visible on the left

Il Kal Nuevu or the New Temple (Novi hram) was a synagogue built in the 1870s. It is located in Sijavuš Pasha's courtyard next to Il Kal Vježu. This synagogue ceased to function in 1930, after the opening of Il Kal Grande, also known simply as the Temple. Before the beginning of the war in Bosnia and Herzegovina, the New Temple Gallery (Galerija Novi Hram) was opened in this synagogue.

=== Bet Tefila a.k.a. Il Kal di la Bilava ===
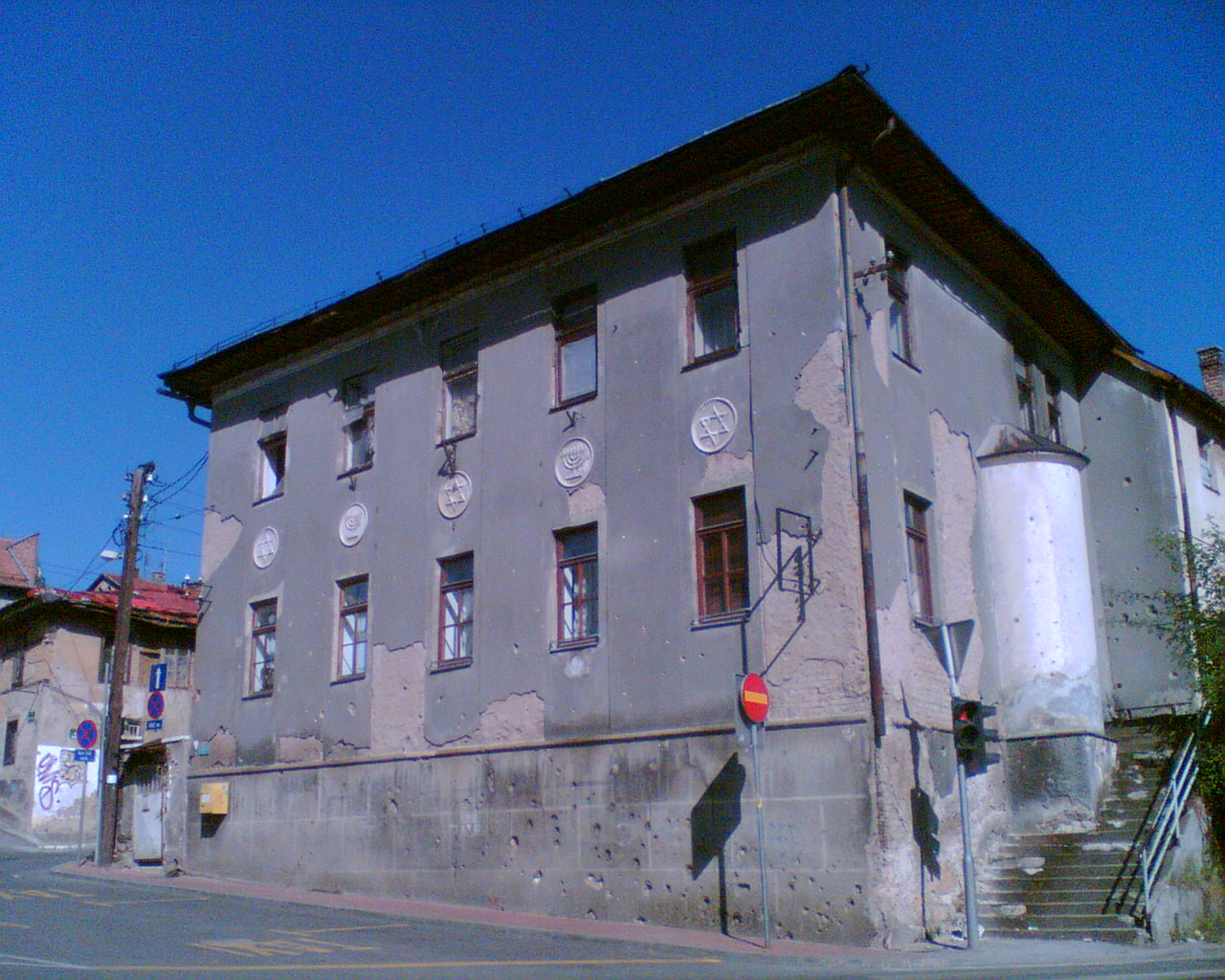
Bet Tefila or Il Kal di la Bilava on Bjelave, Mejtaš

Bet Tefila (House of Prayer) or Il Kal di la Bilava, is a former synagogue in Sarajevo's Mejtaš neighborhood. Bet Tefila was built in 1900/1, and was founded by the chief rabbi Avram Papo. The synagogue building, but with a different purpose, still exists today. In 1941, the Ustasha turned this synagogue into a prison. On the facade of Bet Tefila, the recognizable Jewish symbols of the menorah and the Star of David are still visible today.

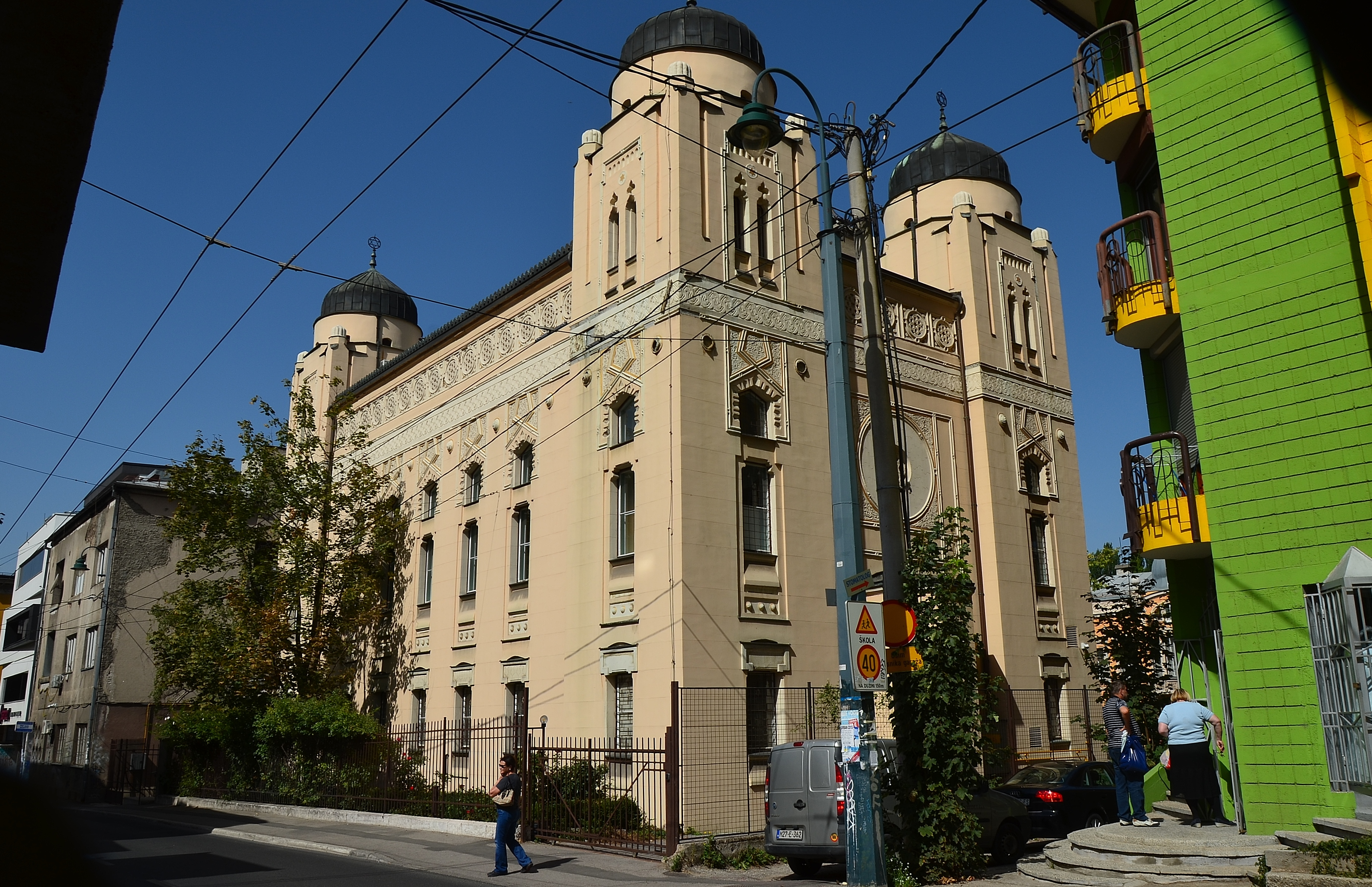
The Ashkenazi Synagogue in Sarajevo

=== Sarajevo Synagogue ===
The Ashkenazi synagogue is located in Drvenija on the left side of the Miljacka river, between the Ćumurija and Drvenija bridges. It was built in 1902 according to the project of the architect Karlo Paržik, for the Jewish Ashkenazi municipality in Sarajevo. The building is an example of pseudo-Moorish style. After the Second World War, this Ashkenazi synagogue was for a long time the only active Jewish temple in Sarajevo. Today, it serves as a joint place of worship for both Ashkenazim and Sephardim, but it also houses the headquarters of the Jewish Municipality in Sarajevo, La Benevolencija society, and the Jewish community in Bosnia and Herzegovina.

=== Il Kal di Lud Mudus ===
Il Kal di Lud Mudus (Temple of the Dumb; Hram nijemih), was a small synagogue located in the Jewish palace in Ćemaluša Street. The palace was built according to the project of Josip Vancaš in 1903 for the Jewish Municipality and the Talmud-Torah School (later Degel Torah, and in 1928 the Jewish Secondary Theological Institute). This temple was also called Il Kal di Capon, after the famous chief rabbi Abraham Capon, the founder of the Ladino language Jewish newspaper La Alborada, and Il Kal di Jayen after Rabbi Shabetay Jayen. The name Il Kal di lus modernus comes from innovations in the interior (the women's balcony did not have wooden bars), and the name Temple of the Dumb, because Abraham Capon introduced the choir into the synagogue, so the faithful had to pray silently.

=== Il Kal di tiju Mači Bohor ===
Il Kal di tiju Mači Bohor was a small synagogue that was located on Banjski Brijeg, in Pehlivanuša Street which passed throughout entire early 20th century Sarajevo. It was the favorite synagogue of Avram Roman, known as Machi Bohor (Uncle Bohor). It was also the synagogue of the Olat Haboker association.

=== Il Kal Grande ===
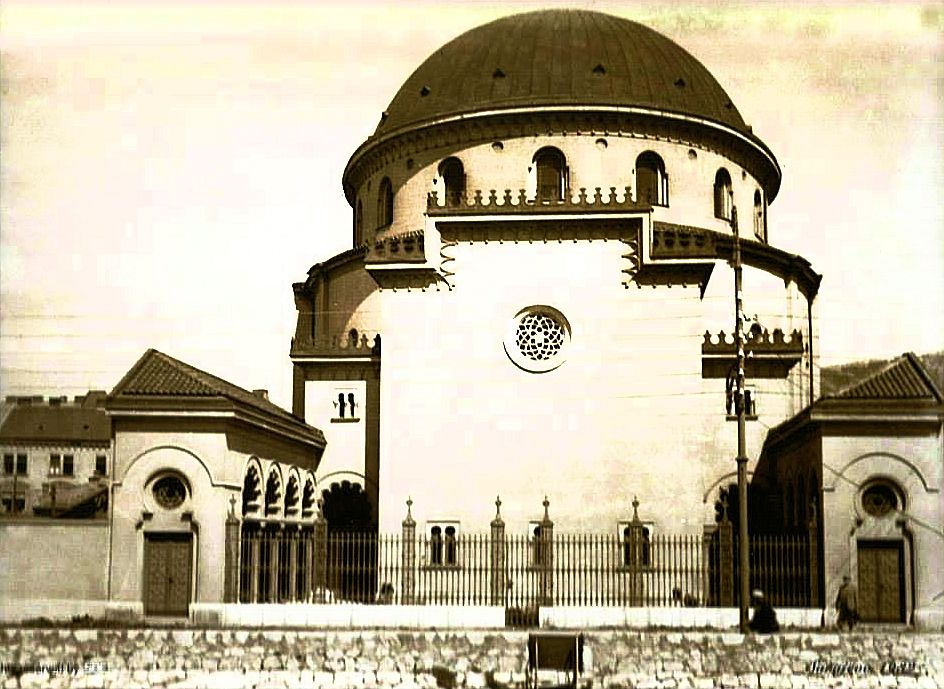
Postcard of Il Kal Grande or Temple in Sarajevo between 1932 and 1941, at the time the third largest dome in Europe

Il Kal Grande, a.k.a. the Temple (Veliki novi hram) was a Sephardic synagogue in Sarajevo, located in Branilaca Sarajeva street, today the Bosnian Cultural Center. The construction of the Temple began on June 15, 1926, and ended on September 14, 1930, when the temple was consecrated. The architect was Rudolf Lubinski from Zagreb. The temple was built in the pseudo-Moorish style. This Jewish synagogue was characterized by an ellipsoid dome covered with copper, the third largest in Europe at the time. During the occupation in the Second World War, the Germans and Ustashas, looted and completely demolished the Temple, the archive, the rich library, the Jewish Museum and the Jewish town hall, which existed next to the temple. The temple was renovated and rebuilt in 1964, by Bosnian architect Ivan Štraus and donated to the city by the Jewish community.

=== Tikun Hacot ===
Tikun Hacot was a small synagogue located in Jaroslava Černija Street, which the Sephardim called La kaleža di lus Ashkenazim (Ashken Street). It was opened at the end of the 19th century, in a residential building. It ceased to operate at the beginning of the Second World War. Tikun hacot is a Kabbalistic term. "Tikun" is a Hebrew word meaning "correction" or "restoration". It is also a mystical term, which signifies the establishment of true order and unity. "Hacot" is also the Hebrew word for "midnight". According to tradition, God fills the cup with tears every time at midnight, so when the cup is full, the Messiah will come. The pious Sarajevo Jews gathered around the "Tikun Hacot" synagogue, got up at midnight, uttered lamentations called "kinot" and wept, helping to fill the cup.

=== Ciduk adin ===
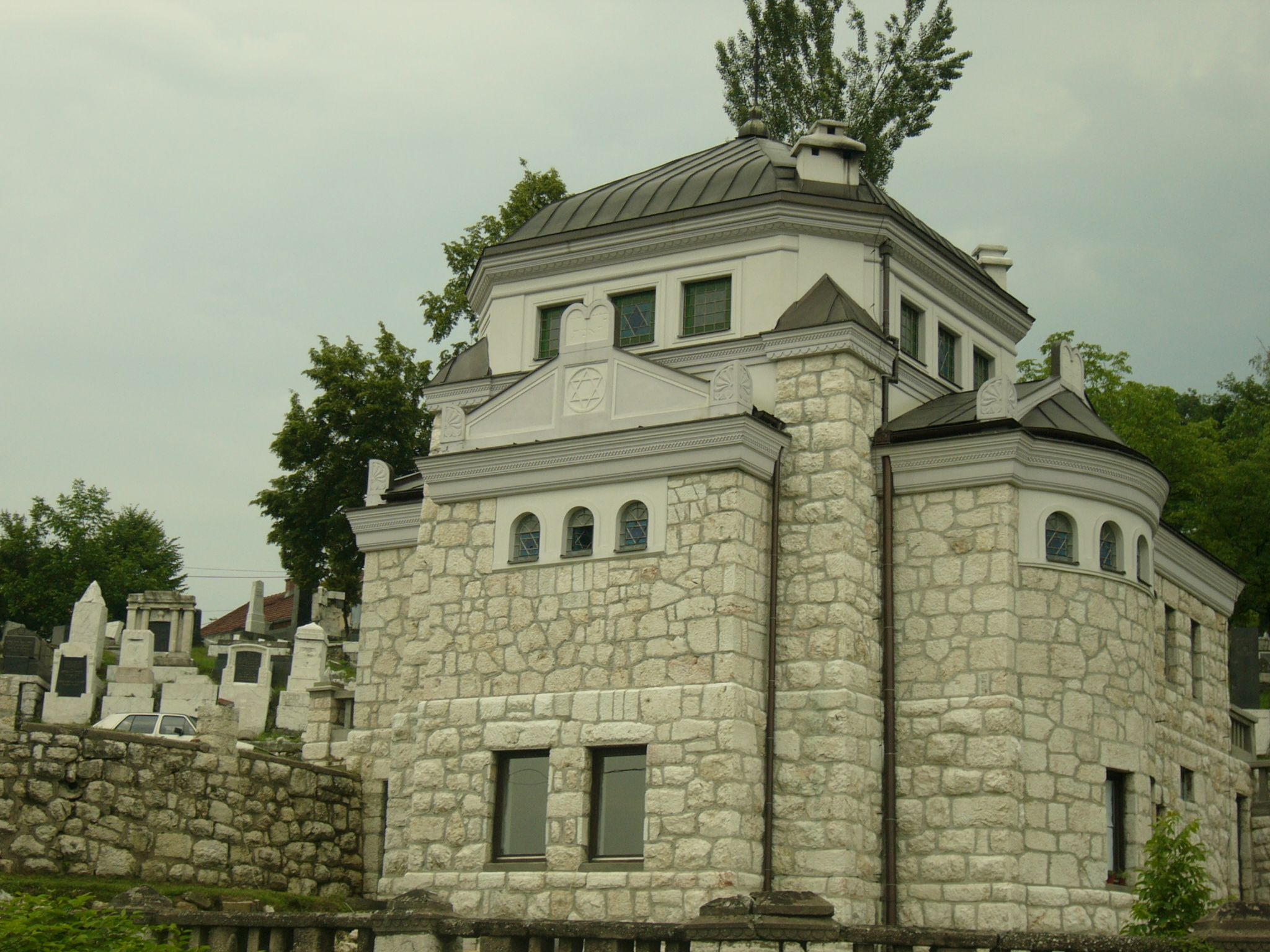
Cikun adin is located at the Jewish cemetery in Sarajevo

Ciduk adin is a chapel at the Old Jewish cemetery in Sarajevo. It was built in 1923/1924. according to the project of engineer Franz Scheidig, co-owner of the then Sarajevo construction company Horvath & Scheidig. The building was designed on the model of the synagogue in Essen. It was consecrated in 1924. Between 1919 and 1930, the cemetery was surrounded by a massive stone fence. A large three-part wrought iron gate was also erected. It was rebuilt before the war in Bosnia and Herzegovina, and badly damaged during the war. After the Bosnian war, the chapel was thoroughly restored.

== Notes ==
↓1 Pinkas is a record, a register of the congregation. Sometimes also the register of births, marriages, deaths. Chronicle of a community.

↑2 Bet-Din i.e. common court. They deliberated together and decided together, until the election of a new rabbi.
