= List of synagogues in Bosnia and Herzegovina =

This is a list of synagogues in Bosnia and Herzegovina which lists active, otherwise used and destroyed synagogues. It is likely incomplete as references and sources for this topic are rather scarce.

Name	Location	Built	Destroyed	Remarks	Picture
Sarajevo Synagogue	Sarajevo	1902	stand	Designed in Moorish Revival style. It is the only currently functional synagogue in Sarajevo.	
Old Synagogue/Kal Viježu	Sarajevo	1580	stand	First synagogue in Bosnia. Today it hosts the museum of Jews of Bosnia and Herzegovina	
Il Kal Grande	Sarajevo	1930	stand	Largest and most ornate synagogue in the Balkans when built. Heavily damaged by Nazis in 1941 with the majority of the Jewish community being killed in The Holocaust. Those Jews who remained after WW2 used Sarajevo Synagogue which was the Ashkenazi synagogue. It was rebuilt after the war and was reopened as "Đuro Đaković Workers' University" in 1965. Currently it hosts the Bosnian Cultural Center which was opened in 1993.	
Il Kal Nuevu	Sarajevo	1870	stand	Built next to the Old Synagogue.	
Il Kal di la Bilava	Sarajevo	1900	stand	Today an apartment building.	
Zenica Synagogue	Zenica	1903	stand	It has been used as a museum since 1968.	
Doboj Synagogue	Doboj	1922 (consecrated in 2003)	stand	The synagogue building is the reconstructed house of Alexander Vrhovski and Oto Kalamar. It is officially named "Bet Shalom Synagogue".	
Old Doboj Synagogue	Doboj	1874	1941	Only the doors of this synagogue survive and are kept in the new one, which was opened in 2003.	
Višegrad Synagogue	Višegrad	1904	stand	Currently the local Red cross headquarters.	
Mostar Synagogue	Mostar	1904	stand	Heavily damaged in Bosnian War and renovated in 1996. It hosts Mostar puppet theatre.	
Old Mostar Synagogue	Mostar	1889?	?	Repurposed hay storage building.	
Travnik Synagogue	Travnik	1863	2008	It replaced a wooden temple built in 1840. Demolished in 2008	
Žepče Synagogue	Žepče	1903	?		
Gračanica Synagogue	Gračanica	1890	?		
Bijeljina Synagogue	Bijeljina	1901	?		
Bihać Synagogue	Bihać	1906	1950		
Derventa Synagogue	Derventa	1911	1950	Heavily damaged by Ustaše in 1941, remnants collapsed in 1950.	
Rogatica Synagogue	Rogatica	1928	stand	Stands, albeit in ruins.	
New Temple	Banja Luka	1937	1944	Consecrated by Chief Rabbi of Yugoslavia Isaac Alcalay.	
First Sephardic Synagogue	Banja Luka	1870	1878	Lost because of a fire.	
Second Sephardic Synagogue	Banja Luka	1880	?		
Third Sephardic Synagogue	Banja Luka	?	?		
Arie Livne Jewish Cultural Center - Ilona Weiss Synagogue	Banja Luka	2014	stand		
Visoko Synagogue	Visoko	1886	?		
Tuzla Synagogue	Tuzla	1936	stand	Currently used as a dry cleaners.	
Stolac Synagogue	Stolac	1832	stand		
Zvornik Synagogue	Zvornik	1902	stand		
