= Economy of Sarajevo =

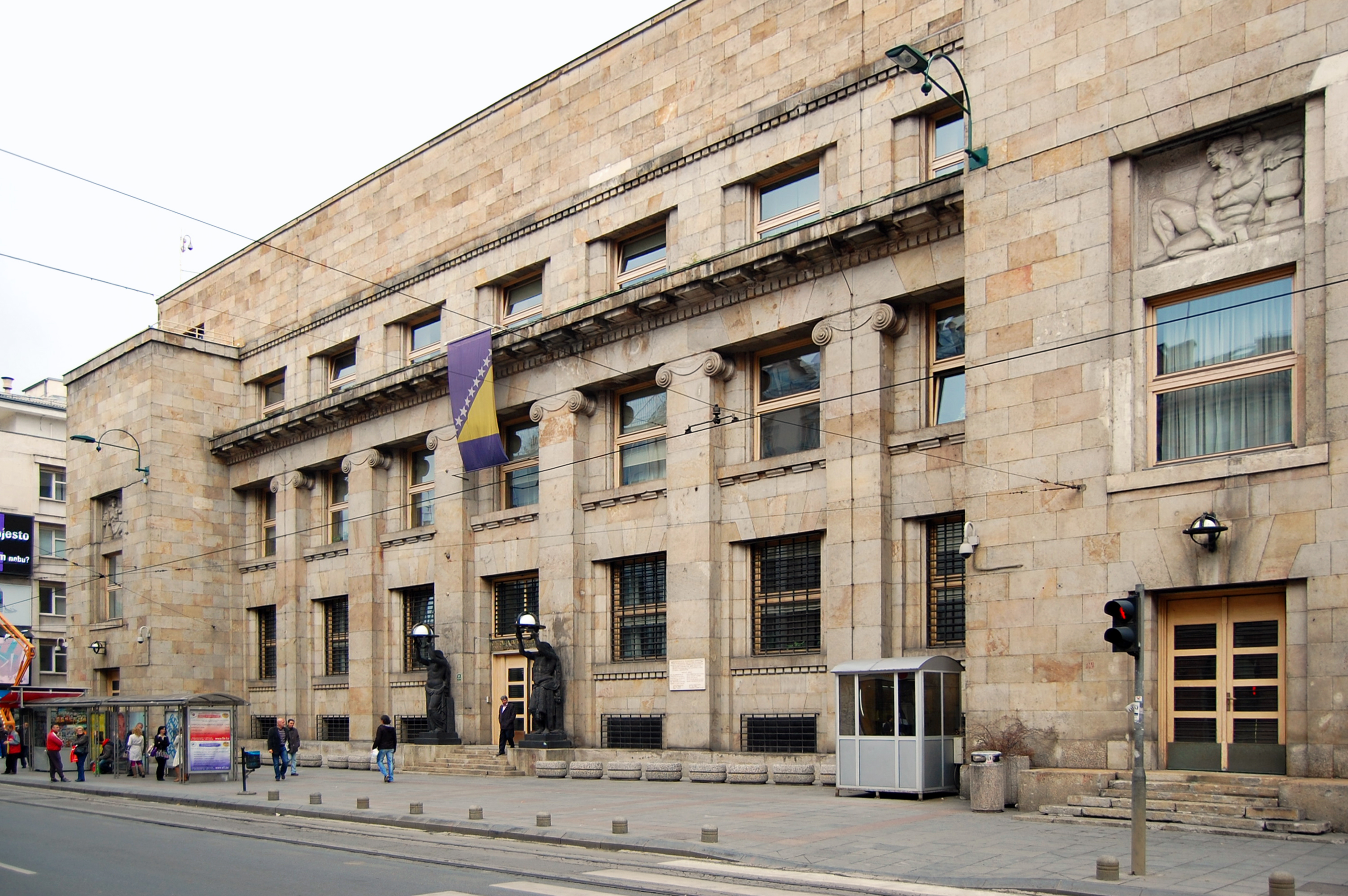
The Central Bank of Bosnia and Herzegovina is situated in Sarajevo

The economy of Sarajevo is based largely on industries such as manufacturing and tourism. Sarajevo is economically one of the strongest regions of Bosnia and Herzegovina. As the center of various levels of area politics, many Sarajevo citizens also work in government. A number of local and international companies are present in the city and contribute to its economic health.

Sarajevo is the most populous region, urban zone and the only metropolitan area in Bosnia and Herzegovina. The area generates approximately 45% of Bosnia and Herzegovina's GDP.

== Overview ==
Sarajevo's economy reached its peak in the 1980s, thanks in large part to the culmination of several decades of industrial development and a tourist boom following the 1984 Winter Olympics, as well as increased international investment. During the Siege of Sarajevo, the Bosnian Serb forces often targeted structures key to the city’s economic health, including the headquarters of companies and many services and public utilities. Since then, the Sarajevo economy has made tremendous progress, significantly better than its post-war state in 1996.

Sarajevo's manufacturing deals with a wide array of products. This includes production of Foods and Beverages, textiles, furniture, automobiles, pharmaceuticals and metalworking. Sarajevo companies also produce unique brands of alcohol and cigarettes.

According to Sarajevo Canton statistics, the greater Sarajevo area in 2002 had a workforce of 278,341. 86,012 (30.6%) of these were, on average, actually employed. Of those 86,012, some 37,253, or 43,3%, were women. The largest number of people were employed in industry (19.4%), trade (12.9%), transport (9.9%) and education (8.7%). The largest concentration of jobs is in Centar municipality (34.5%) and Novo Sarajevo (20.8%).

In 2002, the total export for the greater Sarajevo region was worth about 259.569.000 KM. This was an increase of 21.9% from the previous year. Most of Sarajevo's exports (28.2%) head to Germany, with the United Kingdom following behind at 16.8% and Serbia third with 12.8%. The largest amount of imported goods come from Germany, at 15.8%. With a worth of total import at about 1.322.585.000 KM, the total import is almost 5.1 times the total export.

A variety of important economic institutions are to be found in Sarajevo. The Central Bank of Bosnia and Herzegovina is found in the city, as are numerous other independent banks. Overall, 19 different banks have their headquarters in Sarajevo. The city also holds the Sarajevo Exchange of securities, Institute for accounting and auditing of the Federation of Bosnia and Herzegovina, Board for valuable papers of the Federation of Bosnia and Herzegovina, and the Register of valuable papers of the Federation of Bosnia and Herzegovina.

Foreign companies with a foothold in the Sarajevo region include Brown & Root, Burger King, Coca-Cola, KFC, Porsche, Philip Morris International, Zara and so on. The Bosnian-Malaysian firm Bosmal is also situated in the city. Their main exports are clothing and electrical goods.

== Major companies ==
The UNITIC World Trade Towers in Sarajevo

Major companies based in Sarajevo include:

- BH Telecom
- Bosmal
- Bosnalijek
- Dnevni avaz
- Energoinvest
- Energopetrol
- Oslobođenje
- Sarajevo Tobacco Factory
- Sarajevska pivara
- Unioninvest
- UNITIC
- JP Elektroprivreda BiH
