= Jewish Community of Zenica =

Religious organization in Bosnia and Herzegovina

- Židovska općina Zenica
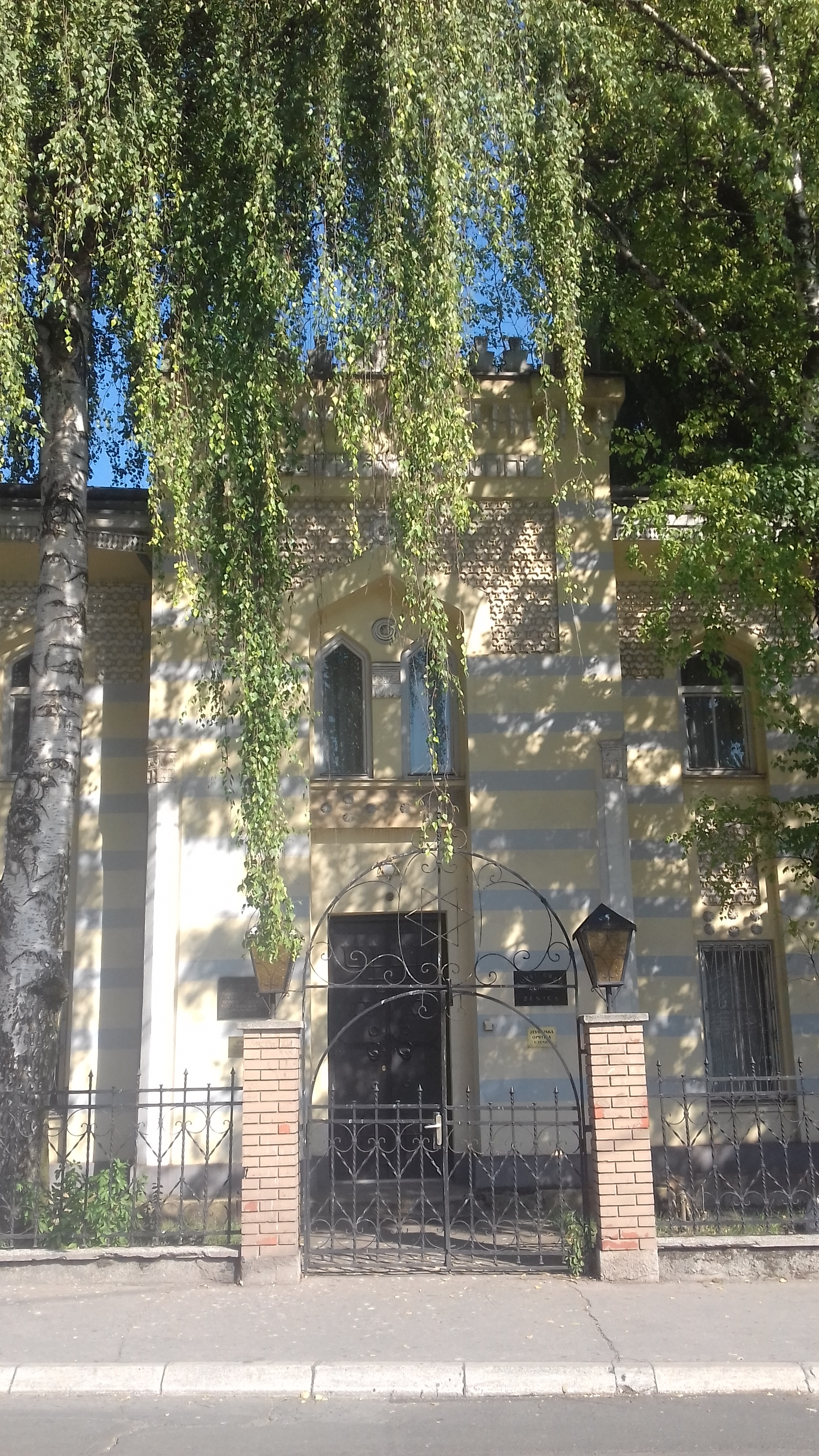
- Entrance to Jewish Community offices
- Type: Religious organization
- Headquarters: Zenica
- Location(s): Bosnia and Herzegovina
- Coordinates: 44.199444°N 17.909444°E
- President: Josip Udiljak

The Jewish Community of Zenica (Židovska općina Zenica) is a religious organization of citizens of Bosnia and Herzegovina of Jewish origin. The community is located in Central Bosnian administrative center Zenica, The building of the old Synagogue of Zenica also houses the administrative headquarters offices of the Jewish Community of Zenica.

== History ==
Jews first began settling in Zenica during the first half of the 18th century, residing near the Zenica čaršija (marketplace).

According to the 1879 population census in Bosnia and Herzegovina, there were 10,204 Jews in the country, of whom 294 lived in Zenica. Based on the size of its Jewish population, Zenica ranked sixth in Bosnia and Herzegovina, following Sarajevo, Travnik, Bijeljina, Banja Luka, and Tuzla.

The Jews of Zenica suffered heavily during World War II. Out of the 196 Jews present in the city at the time of the creation of the fascist Independent State of Croatia (NDH), 172 were killed by the Ustaše. The first group of 44 Zenica Jews, consisting mostly of men, was deported on 20 September 1941 to the Jasenovac concentration camp. In 1942, the vast majority of the remaining Zenica Jews were deported to Jasenovac in three separate groups, leaving only 25 individuals to survive the war.

== Zenica Synagogue ==
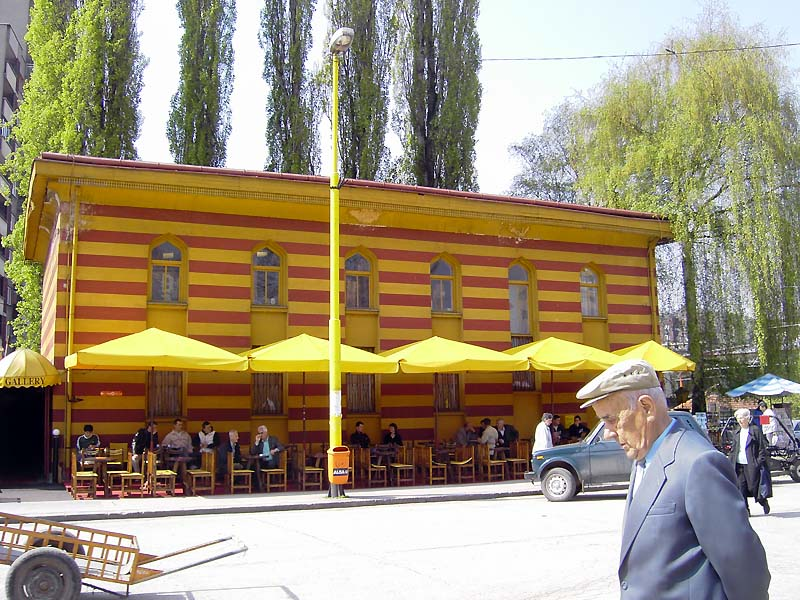
The former Zenica Synagogue, now a museum

The first synagogue in Zenica was built of wood around 1870, though little documentation about it survives. The current Zenica Synagogue is situated in the urban zone of Zenica, between the Old Čaršija and the residential zones of Pišće and Potok.

It was constructed between 1903 and 1905, and was consecrated in 1906 by Dr. Samuel Vesel. The "La Lira" singing society from Sarajevo performed at the consecration ceremony. The synagogue was designed by Miloš Komadina, an engineer who received his technical education in Zürich and Vienna. The initial proponent for building a permanent, solid-material synagogue was Rafael Levi, one of the founders of the Jewish Community of Zenica.

The exterior of the building was executed in the Moorish Revival style (pseudo-Moorish style). The first rabbi to serve in both the original wooden structure and the new synagogue was Jozef Levi, who died in 1928. The top of the northern facade originally featured a semi-circular shape, which was later modified into a flat edge. It is the only synagogue in Bosnia and Herzegovina that featured a round clock at the top of its northern facade (facing the Kočeva river); however, the clock is no longer present and was not replaced during subsequent restorations.

The synagogue featured a separate gallery entrance for women on the left side of the main entrance, which was later bricked over and converted into a window. The winding stairs that led to the women's gallery still exist inside the building, though the gallery itself was partitioned into office spaces.

During World War II, the synagogue was devastated and repurposed as a stable for the German army. From 1945 to 1967, the building served multiple functions, ranging from a warehouse to a furniture showroom. In 1966, following an agreement with the Jewish Community of Zenica and the Federation of Jewish Communities of Yugoslavia, the building was permanently ceded to the City of Zenica and the Zenica Museum. Through the efforts of museum director Fikret Ibrahimpašić and funding from the Municipal Assembly of Zenica, a complete restoration of the facade was completed based on historical photographs.

A memorial plaque was placed on the facade with the following inscription:

In memory of 185 Jews of Zenica who perished in death camps and the National Liberation War from 1941–1945, this memorial plaque is raised by the citizens of the city of Zenica.

In 1967, the first permanent historical-ethnological exhibition of the Zenica Museum was opened inside the synagogue. The modernized interior houses archaeological, historical, and art exhibits related to Zenica and its population, including the history of the local Jewish community.

Today, the building also houses an administrative office of the Jewish Community of Zenica.

== Old Jewish Cemetery in Zenica ==
The Old Jewish Cemetery remains in Zenica today, containing the graves of 116 individuals. It is located at the southern exit of the city in the Raspotočje neighborhood. The oldest tombstone at this cemetery dates back to 1747. The last burial took place in 1964 for an individual named Jakov Ozmo. The most prominent surnames among the Zenica Jews include Trinki, Danon, Elazar, Baruh, Montiljo, Ozmo, Papo, Pinto, Salom, Libling, and Vajs.
