= Bosnian Cultural Center =

National cultural center in Sarajevo, Bosnia and Herzegovina

- Bosanski kulturni centar (BKC)
- Interactive map of Bosnian Cultural Center
- Address: Branilaca Sarajeva 24
- Location: Sarajevo, Bosnia and Herzegovina
- Coordinates: 43°51′28″N 18°25′28″E
- Owner: Sarajevo Canton
- Capacity: 854
- Type: Cultural center

Construction
- Built: 1930
- Opened: 1931
- Renovated: 1965, 1999
- Expanded: 2015
- Architects: Rudolf Lubinski, Ivan Štraus

Website
- www.bkc.ba

The Bosnian Cultural Center (Bosnian, Croatian and Serbian: Bosanski kulturni centar; Босански културни центар – BKC) is a national cultural center located in Sarajevo, Bosnia and Herzegovina. The center was established in 1966 and is housed in a former synagogue built in the Moorish Revival architectural style. The center is run as a public institution by the Sarajevo Canton.

== History ==
In 1923 the Jewish Municipality of Sarajevo drew out plans to build a monumental synagogue in the city, at that time the capital of the Drinska banovina, which was home to one of the largest Jewish communities in the Kingdom of Yugoslavia. The preliminary plans outlined the municipality's desire for the synagogue to be the largest in Southeastern Europe. The motive behind the project was that none of the city's existing synagogues could hold more than a fifth of the total Jewish congregation. A project board formed by the municipality and headed by notable Jewish industrialist, Avram Majer Altarac, purchased the land for 100,000 CHF, with construction beginning in 1926. The famous Croatian Art Nouveau architect Rudolf Lubinski was hired to design the building. His concept of a lavish Moorish Revivalist design, which was prevalent in the architecture of Sarajevo since Austro-Hungarian times was green lighted, with construction being completed in 1930. The synagogue, known as the Il Kal Grande, was officially opened on 14 May 1931.

After the Nazi invasion of Yugoslavia in 1941 and the establishment of the puppet Independent State of Croatia, severe racial laws were implemented by the occupying forced which lead to the desecration and looting of the synagogue in the first months of the occupation. After the end of the war the Jewish Municipality, whose community was desecrated during the holocaust with over 90 percent being murdered in the Nazi concentration camp system, donated the building to the city of Sarajevo. In 1965 architect Ivan Štraus was chosen to head renovation work on the building, which was reestablished as the Đuro Đaković Center, named after Yugoslav communist revolutionary Đuro Đaković. The center contained a state of the art movie theatre, numerous workshops, classrooms and an art gallery.

In 1993, during the Siege of Sarajevo, the center was symbolically renamed the Bosnian Cultural Center. During subsequent years it has become the premier cultural center in Bosnia and Herzegovina, hosting weekly concerts, theatre productions and film screenings. It is one of the venues of the Sarajevo Film Festival, Sarajevo Jazz Festival and the main venue for Juventafest. It was expanded and renovated in 2015. Further renovations were completed in 2019.

== Programme ==
The Bosnian Cultural Center offers a dynamic range of cultural programs designed to celebrate local and regional art, music, literature, and theater. Among the center’s diverse offerings are art exhibitions, live music performances, and theater productions, showcasing both established and emerging artists from Bosnia and Herzegovina. BKC hosts a series of regular events, such as book presentations and workshops, and is also closely involved in significant cultural festivals, including the Sarajevo Film Festival, where it often acts as a venue and gathering point for international attendees.

Additionally, the BKC organizes thematic cultural events, often reflecting important historical moments and social issues in the region. Notably, exhibitions and talks related to the commemoration of the Srebrenica genocide are frequently held at the center. The programming also includes innovative events like the “Silent Disco,” where participants dance with wireless headphones, merging contemporary cultural trends with local engagement. These events aim to create a space that appeals to a broad audience, blending modern artistic expressions with traditional Bosnian cultural elements
