= Zenica Synagogue =

Historical building in Bosnia and Herzegovina

- Bosnian: Sinagoga u Zenici
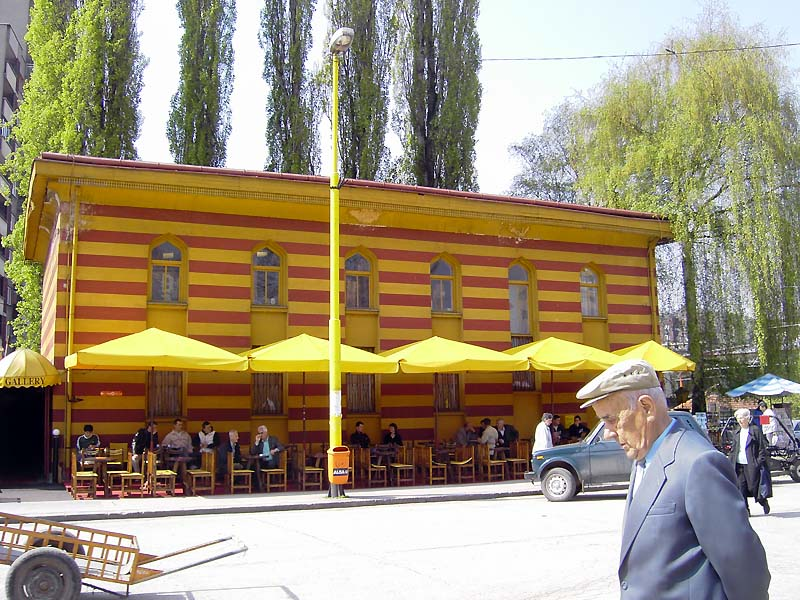
- The former synagogue, now museum, in 2006

- Location of the former synagogue in Bosnia and Herzegovina

Religion
- Affiliation: Orthodox Judaism (former)
- Rite: Nusach Sefard
- Ecclesiastical or organizational status: Synagogue (1907–c. 1941); Jewish history museum (since 1968)
- Status: Closed (as a synagogue); Repurposed; Office of the Jewish Community of Zenica

Location
- Location: Jevrejska bb 1, Zenica Zenica-Doboj Canton
- Country: Bosnia and Herzegovina
- Interactive map of Zenica Synagogue
- Coordinates: 44°11′58″N 17°54′34″E

Architecture
- Type: Synagogue architecture
- Style: Moorish Revival
- Established: c. 1750
- Completed: 1907

KONS of Bosnia and Herzegovina
- Official name: Zgrada nekadašnje Sinagoge, historijski spomenik
- Type: Category II cultural property
- Designated: 6 February 2013 (decision No. 06.1-02.3-53/13-6)
- Reference no.: 3710
- List of National Monuments of Bosnia and Herzegovina

The Zenica Synagogue (Bosnian: Sinagoga u Zenici) is a former Orthodox Jewish congregation and synagogue that existed in the town of Zenica, Bosnia and Herzegovina between the years of 1903 and 1941. Since 1968, the building has been used as a Jewish history museum and was listed as a national monument in 2013. The building of the old Synagogue of Zenica also houses the administrative headquarters offices of the Jewish Community of Zenica.

== History ==
The history of the Jews in Bosnia and Herzegovina dates from the Expulsion of Jews from Spain in 1492. While Jews did not settle in Zenica until 1750, most of these early settlers were Sephardic Jews; who were joined in 1878 by Ashkenazi Jews from Austria-Hungary. By 1885, the community had built a synagogue next to the local bazaar and the Old Jewish Cemetery outside of the city. The current synagogue building was built between 1904 and 1907. In 1910 the Jewish community in Zenica was 297, with about 200 living in the city on the eve of the Invasion of Yugoslavia.

185 members of the Zenica Jewish community were killed in the Holocaust, and those who returned to their homes after the war were unable to rebuild the demolished synagogue building themselves, so the building took on other roles. Zenica Ironworks used the building to house their printing house, and in the 1960s the building housed a furniture store. In 1968 the Jewish Community of Yugoslavia reached an agreement with the city to turn the building into a local museum.

== Description ==
The building of the Zenica Synagogue was based on Neo-Moorish Architecture and measured 10.2x18.5 m.

== See also ==
- Jews in Bosnia and Herzegovina
- List of synagogues in Bosnia and Herzegovina
