= Mostar Synagogue =

Coordinates: 43°20′27″N 17°49′02″E

Mostar Synagogue is a significant location in Bosnia and Herzegovina's Jewish history, it served as the local Jewish community's house of worship for several decades before becoming a cultural centre, which it still functions as to this day.

== History ==
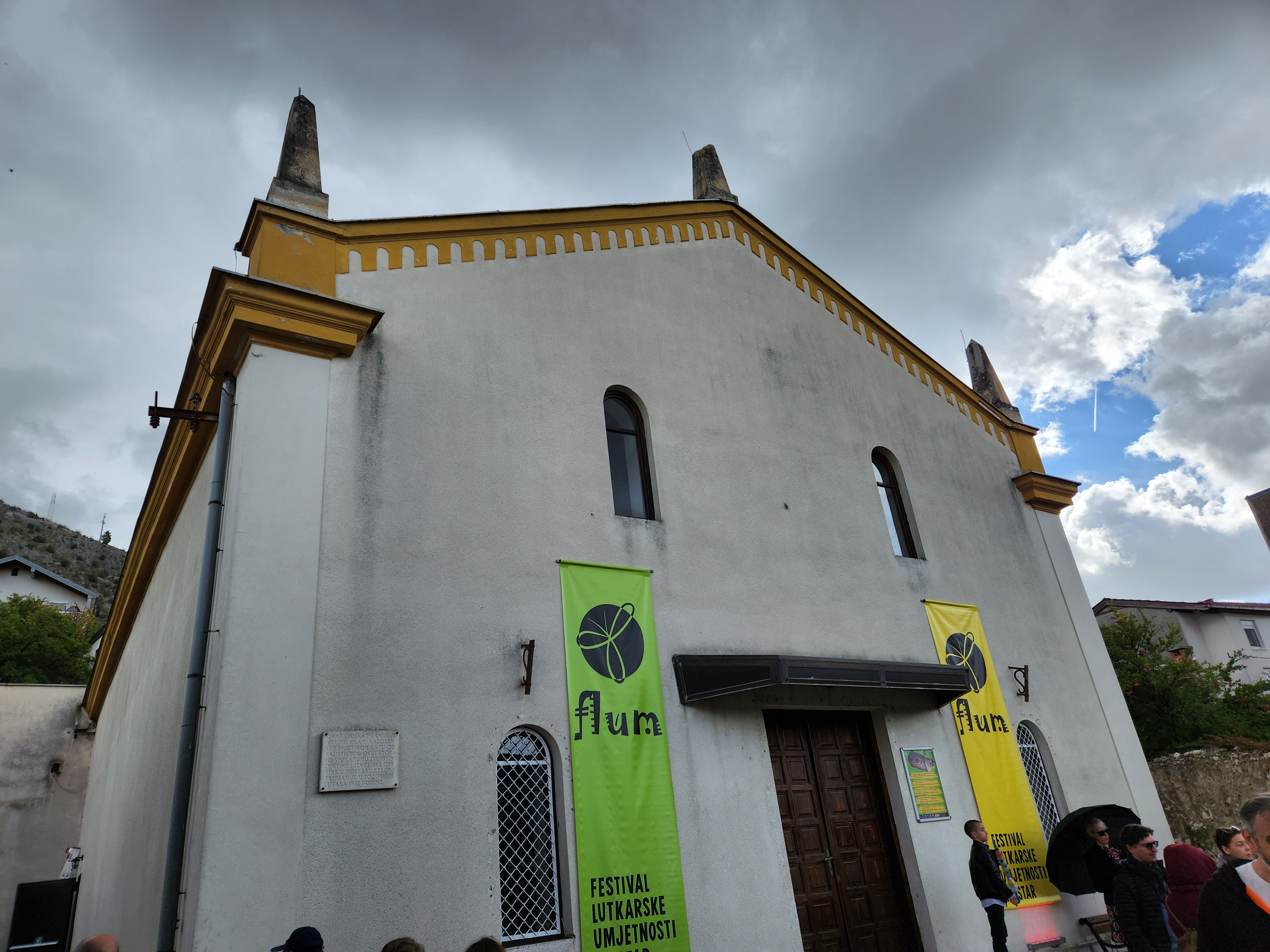
Current look of the former synagogue

First mention of Jewish population in Mostar dates back to around 1570, when Sephardic Jews took refuge there due to Alhambra Decree. In 19th century, a number Ashkenazi Jews moved there while Mostar was a part of Austria-Hungary, bringing with them Yiddish language and their culture. It was the first recognized mixed Sephardic and Ashkenazi communities in Europe. First synagogue in Mostar was established in 1889 in Mukića (Braće Šarića) street and was a repurposed hay storage building, it was also the first synagogue in Herzegovina.

Due to a population growth and insufficient size of the former synagogue, a committee for building a new one was established, its members were David Kohn, David Fromer, and L. Rosenfeld. Cost of the project was estimated at 17,500 kr, sufficient funds were not acquired however, so the committee was left in a 9000 kr debt and had to reach out to the governing body of Bosnia and Herzegovina for help. The current synagogue building was built in 1904 with it being roughly 20 by 11 meters in size with 70 cm thick walls. It sustained heavy damage during WW2 and Jewish community of Mostar was not able to pay for its renovation, so it was decided to give it to the city, which decided to turn it into a puppet theatre, which received numerous awards during its existence, and added two wings for the theatre administration. It was also heavily damaged during the Bosnian War, first when the nearby church was demolished, and later on by shelling, which caused the entire roof to catch fire and collapse. It was subsequently rebuilt and declared a National monument of Bosnia and Herzegovina.

Even though the Jewish community in Mostar is not very large nowadays, there have been talks of a new synagogue being built since the late 1990s, as the community hasn't had one since 1952.

== See also ==
- List of synagogues in Bosnia and Herzegovina
- History of the Jews in Bosnia and Herzegovina
