= Puppet Theatre Mostar =

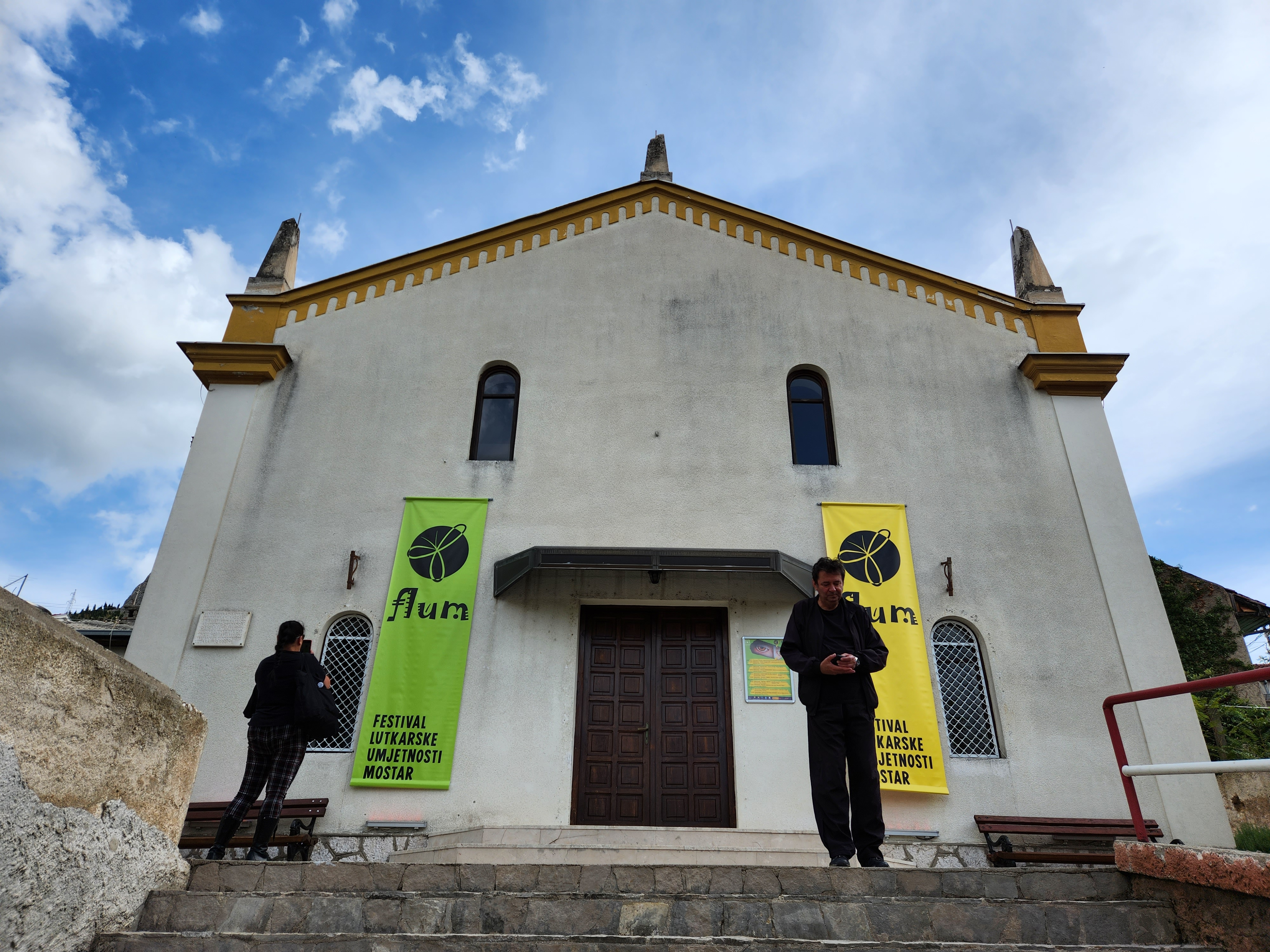
- Interactive map of Puppet Theatre Mostar
- Address: Braće Ćišića 15; Mostar; Bosnia and Herzegovina
- Coordinates: 43°20′27″N 17°49′02″E
- Owner: City of Mostar
- Capacity: 150 seats
- Designation: Public Institution

Construction
- Opened: 1952
- Years active: 1952–present

Website
- www.plm.ba

Puppet Theatre Mostar (Bosnian: Pozorište lutaka Mostar) is a city sponsored theatre in Mostar, Bosnia and Herzegovina. It was founded in 1952 and it is housed in a former Jewish synagogue in eastern Mostar. The building was donated in the early 1950s by the Jewish Community in Mostar for the express purpose of hosting a puppet theatre.

Puppet Theatre Mostar's founder, first director and theatre manager was Dorde Doka Bovan. He was succeeded by Antonio Ante Karačić, who first began to cooperate with some of the biggest names in puppetry arts in Czechoslovakia. After him followed Jovo Spajic, Milivoje Mrkic, Miro Pelić, Muhamed Nametak and since the year 2000, Ranka Mutevelić who established cooperation with some of the most prominent puppet creators from Bulgaria, Poland and Slovenia.

In 2009 Puppet Theatre Mostar received ten awards at various international and domestic festivals. Prizes included awards for the actors, set design, puppet design and costumes. The puppet theater's ensemble consists of five actors who maintain the current repertoire of a dozen plays, ranging from the classic puppet theatre to puppet musicals, interactive plays, plays for the children and youth. Theatre building is occasionally used for community events, workshops, and award ceremonies.
