= Drvenija =

- Neighborhood
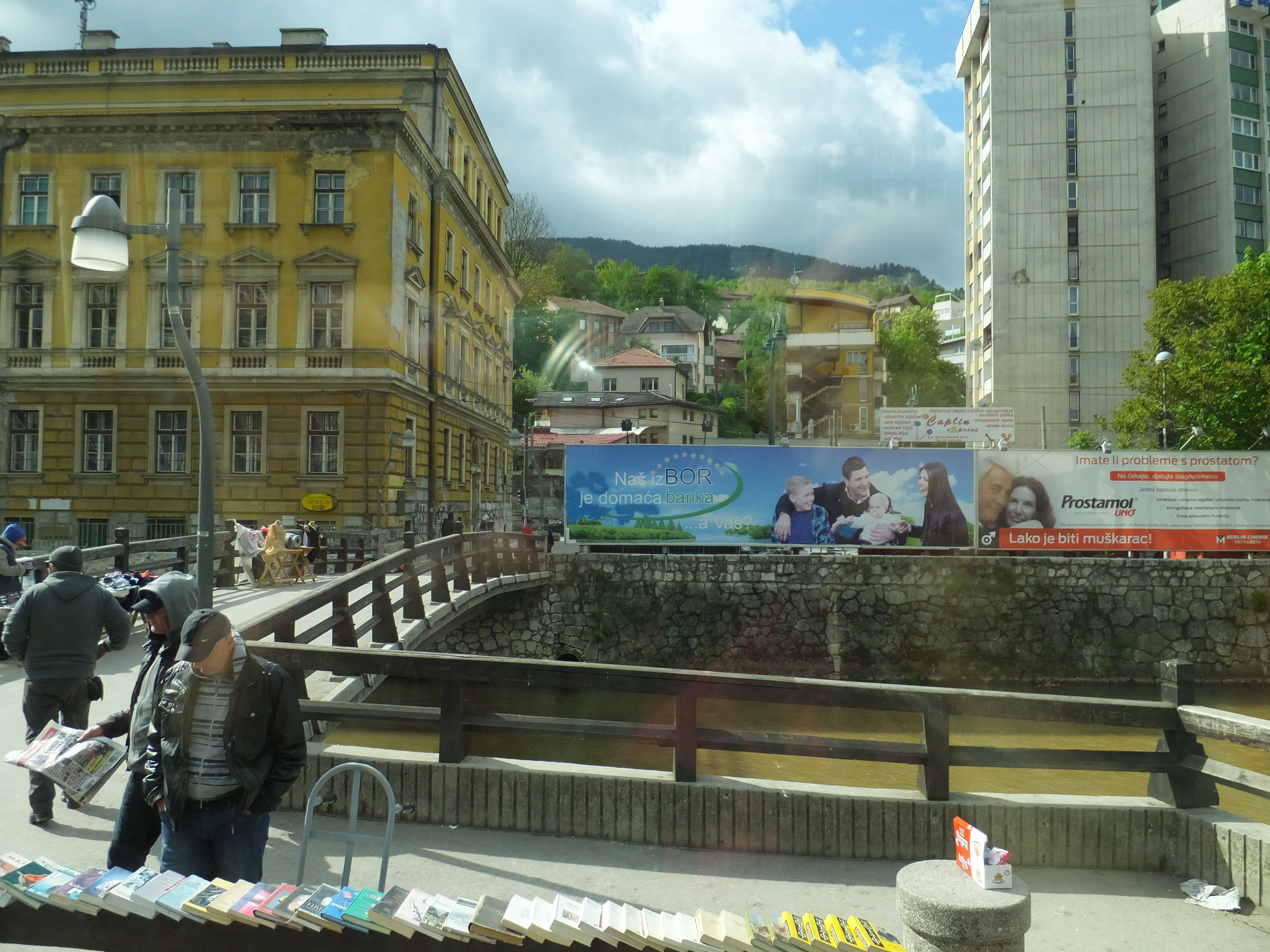
- Drvenija in 2016
- Country: Bosnia and Herzegovina
- Time zone: UTC+2 (CET)
- Area code: +387

Drvenija is a neighborhood in Sarajevo, Bosnia and Herzegovina.

The neighborhood was named after the bridge that was built in 1898.
