= United Investment and Trading Company =

Twin skyscrapers in Sarajevo, Bosnia and Herzegovina

UNITIC World Trade Towers
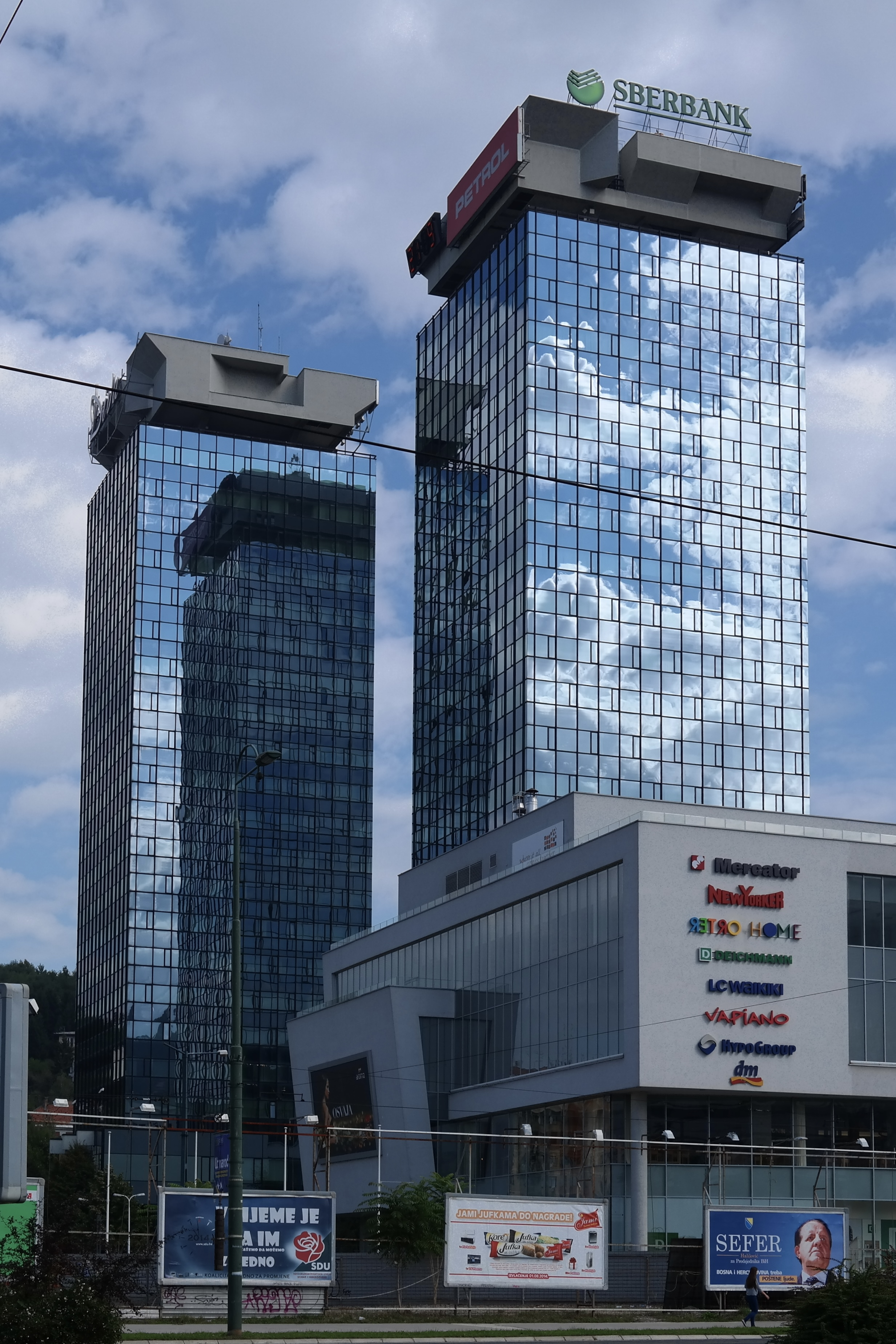
- The Twin Skyscrapers in September 2014
- Interactive map of the UNITIC World Trade Towers area

General information
- Location: Fra Anđela Zvizdovića, Sarajevo, Bosnia and Herzegovina
- Coordinates: 43°51′25.56″N 18°24′20.35″E

Design and construction
- Architect: Ivan Štraus

The United Investment and Trading Company (UNITIC), formerly UNIS Holding BiH, is a joint venture company between UNIS Holding and Kuwait Consulting & Investment Co. The company owns and operates the 111 m tall UNITIC Twin Skyscrapers in Sarajevo, Bosnia and Herzegovina. The company was formed in 1998 and has since invested KM 45 million in renovating the UNITIC Business Center.

== History ==
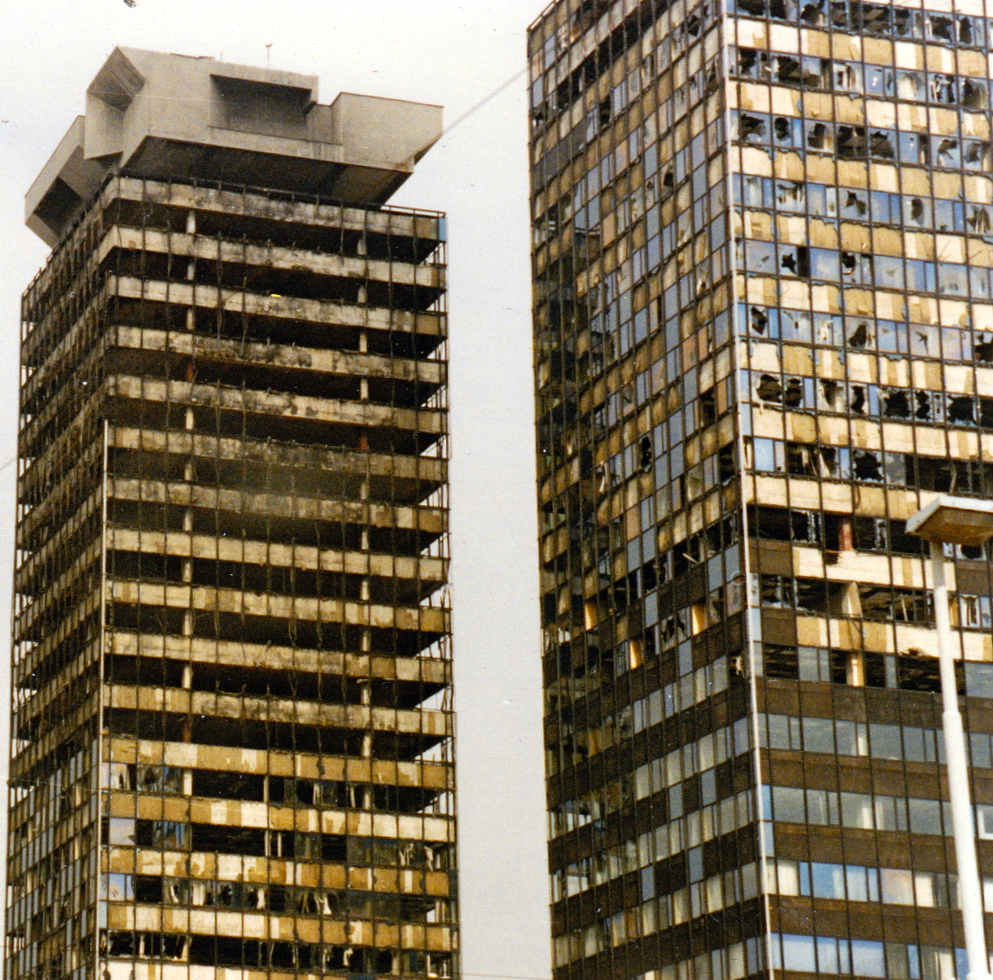
The damaged towers in 1996

The UNITIC Twin Skyscrapers, designed by Ivan Štraus, were built in 1986 in the Marijin dvor neighborhood of Sarajevo. They were colloquially named "Momo and Uzeir" after a Yugoslav radio comedy show duo made up of Bosniak Rejhan Demirdžić and Serbian-born Rudolf "Rudi" Alvađ. The towers were heavily damaged by shelling during the siege of Sarajevo in the Bosnian War, but remained standing, becoming symbols of resilience. They were renovated after the war.

== Facilities ==
UNITIC offers its clients office space and meeting rooms which can be rented for long durations of time. As of the end of 2005 and the beginning of 2006, the UNITIC Complex was at 90% occupancy rate. This has prompted the corporation to seek expansion.

The UNITIC website states this as the future plan of the company:

"Future plans of UNITIC were directed to both new activities and extension towards hotel Holiday Inn in order to create an integral whole and contribute to completion of the facilities of the Center itself."

Local media reports from mid-2006 stated that UNITIC was planning a new tower for its complex, the new tower would stand at 30 floors height, greatly expanding the company's space. The worth of the proposed project would be KM 70 million.

== Office space ==
- Sberbank BH
- International Red Cross and Red Crescent Movement-Delegation in Bosnia and Herzegovina
- Avon Cosmetics
- Organisation for Economic Co-operation and Development
- Organization for Security and Co-operation in Europe
- Sarajevo Stock Exchange (Sarajevska Berza)
- Raiffeisen Brokers
- UNHCR
- Sony
- Petrol BH Oil Company
- Oracle Software
- Radio Slobodna Evropa
- SoftNET d.o.o.

== See also ==
- List of companies of the Socialist Federal Republic of Yugoslavia
