= Jewish Museum of Bosnia and Herzegovina =

Coordinates: 43°51′36″N 18°25′40″E

- Muzej Jevreja Bosne i Hercegovine (Bosnian)
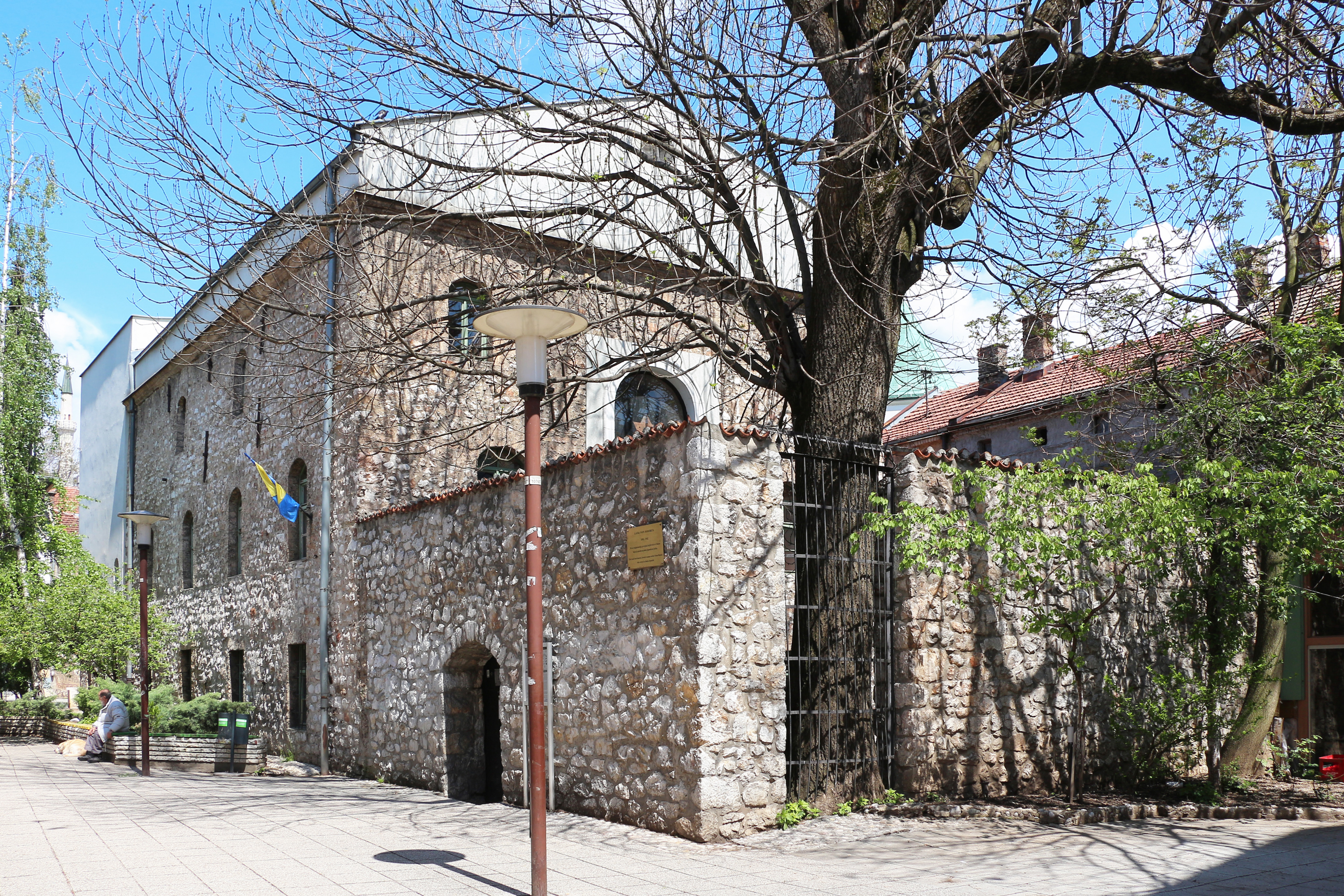
- Established: 1966
- Location: Velika Avlija bb, Sarajevo, Bosnia and Herzegovina
- Type: Jewish history museum
- Website: muzejsarajeva.ba/en

The Jewish Museum of Bosnia and Herzegovina (Bosnian: Muzej Jevreja Bosne i Hercegovine; Serbo-Croatian Cyrillic: Музеј Јевреја Босне и Херцеговине; Hebrew: המוזיאון היהודי של בוסניה והרצגובינה, romanized: HaMuzeon HaYehudi Shel Bosniya VeHertzegovinah) is a museum located in Sarajevo, Bosnia and Herzegovina, dedicated to preserving and showcasing the history and culture of the Jewish community there. It is housed in the oldest synagogue in the country, built in 1581.

== Exhibitions ==
The museum's permanent exhibition depicts over 400 years of Jewish life in Bosnia and Herzegovina. It includes artifacts such as religious objects, manuscripts, photographs, and traditional clothing. The collection features items from the Ottoman period through the Austro-Hungarian era, World War II, and the post-war period. The museum also houses a collection of Ladino and other Jewish books, some printed over 200 to 300 years ago.

== Gallery ==
Entrance

Jewish Museum of Bosnia and Herzegovina.

Memorial plaque

First floor.

Second floor.

Collection

Jewish Museum of Bosnia and Herzegovina.

Photo collection

== See also ==
- Sarajevo Haggadah
- History of the Jews in Bosnia and Herzegovina
- List of Jewish museums
- List of synagogues in Bosnia and Herzegovina
