= Ivan Štraus =

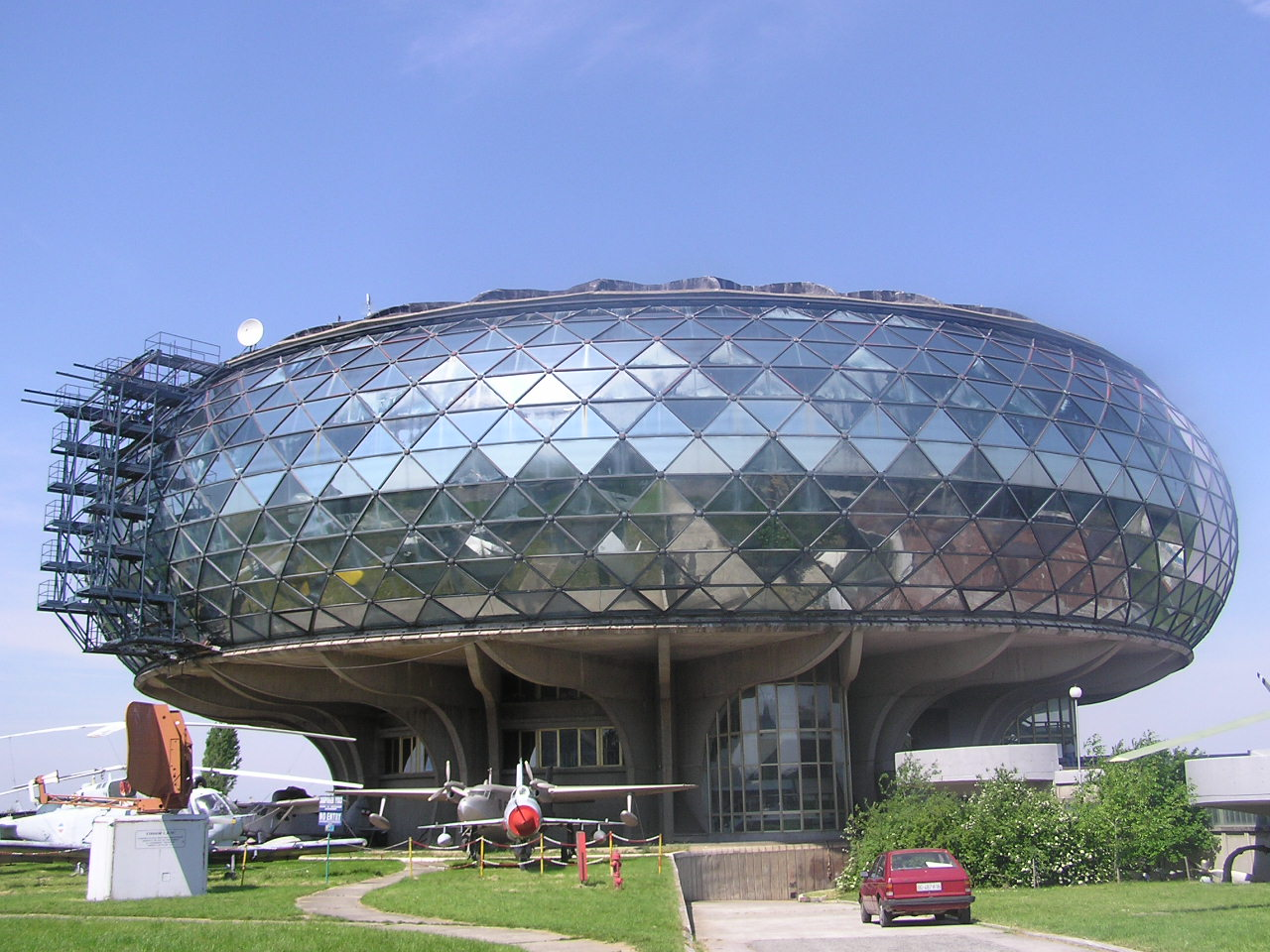
Museum of Aviation (Belgrade), 1989

BH Electric Power Building (Elektroprivreda), 1978

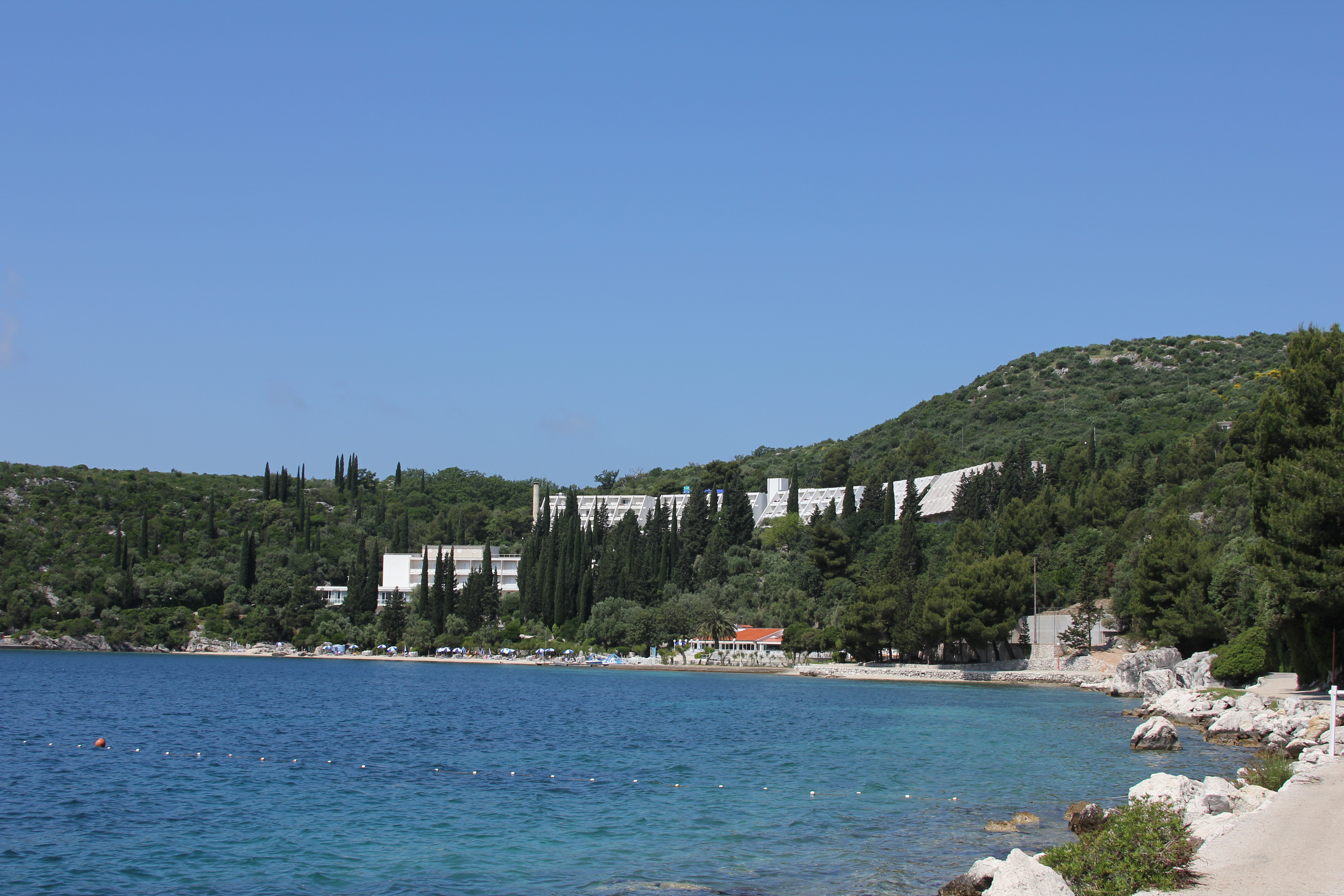
Hotel Osmine, Slano, 1972

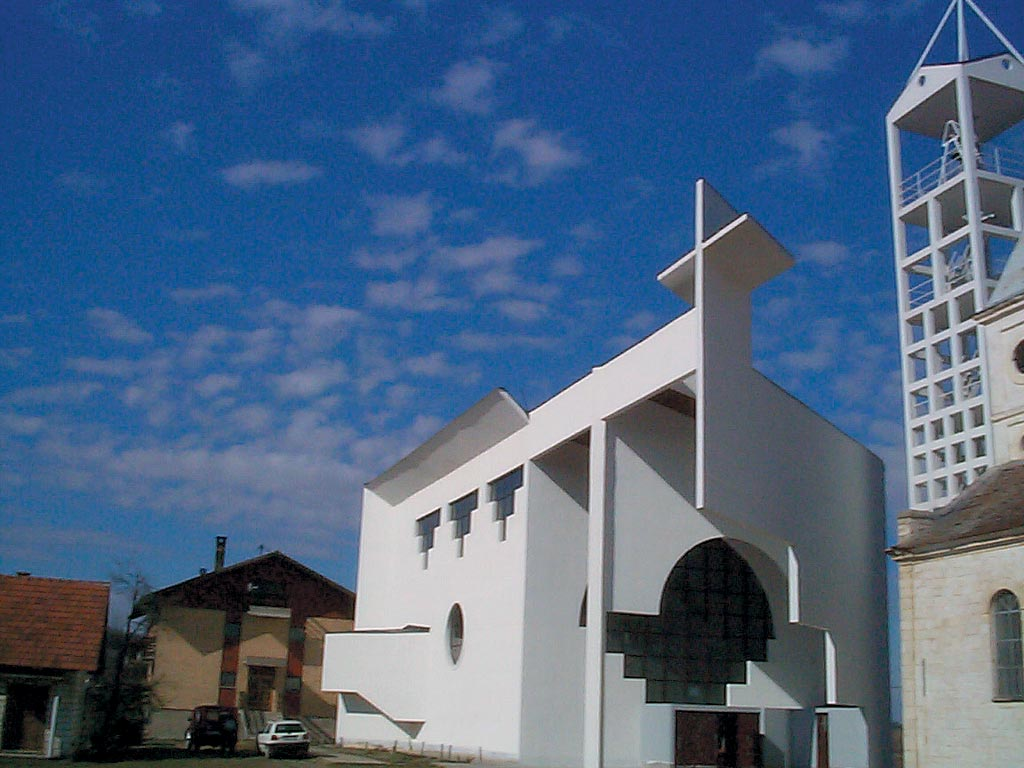
Church of St.Francis, Zovik, Brčko, 1996

Ivan Štraus (24 June 1928 – 24 August 2018) was a Bosnian architect.

== Life ==
Born in 1928, in Kremna, Zlatibor county, Serbia, to a Slovenian father and mother from Herzegovina. He identified as a "Bosnian of Slovenian and Herzegovinian descent".

Štraus grew up in Banja Luka. He started architectural studies in Zagreb in 1947 and graduated in 1958 from the Technology Faculty of the University of Sarajevo in the city of Sarajevo, where he taught as an assistant. From 1952 he began making deals for participating architectural tenders, and from 1959 to 1961 and then from 1965 to 1984 he worked for the Arhitekt studio in Sarajevo. Since then he has won 30 major awards for architecture and has won many national and international tenders.

Štraus wrote this in his diary as he watched the Unis towers burn on June 8, 1992, at the start of the Bosnian war: "I watched with immeasurable sadness. (...) The moments of its construction and my pride of the two (towers) passed in front of my eyes like on film roll, while one of them lit up tonight like a torch."

In his last years, Štraus suffered injustice due to a process he undertook against the current owners of the Unis towers in Sarajevo (now Unitic). Štraus sued for not adhering to his original plans during their reconstruction and lost the case. Repeated requests to the owners of Unitic to forgive the debt due to the lost case were unanimously declined.

According to Oslobođenje, "His architectural masterpieces and inexhaustible creativity shaped one architectural era in the capital of Bosnia and Herzegovina. Academician Strauss gave the city Neymarian pearls, some of which, like the Holiday Inn or UNITIC, became symbols of the city on Miljacka."

He died on 24 August 2018 in Sarajevo, exactly two months after turning 90 years old in June. He was buried four days later, on 28 August at the "Bare" Cemetery in Sarajevo.

== Work ==
His major projects include:

- Bosnian Cultural Center "Đuro Đaković", 1965
- General Post Office, Ministry of PTT and Imperial Board of Telecommunications in Addis Ababa (1969),
- BH Electric Power Building (Elektroprivreda) in Sarajevo, 1978
- Holiday Inn hotel in Sarajevo, 1983
- Unis towers in Sarajevo (United Investment and Trading Company), 1986
- Museum of Aviation (Belgrade), 1989 - prized in 1990 with the BORBA Federal Award for the best architectural achievement in Yugoslavia
- Residential complexes of the Sun settlement (Naselje Sunca), settlement Radojka Lakić, etc.

Some of Štraus' works were destroyed during the Bosnian war, such as the Olympic Press Centre in Bjelasnica built in 1983. Other works of him include Hotel Osmine in Slano near Dubrovnik (1972), Army Home in Derventa (1977), Hotel Onogošt in Nikšić (1982), Catholic Church in Zovik near Brčko (1996), Chapel in St. Ante's Monastery in Sarajevo (1996), redesign of the Facade of Ministry Building of Bosnia and Herzegovina with T. Neidhardt (2006), Catholic Church Dobrinja in Sarajevo (2010).

International architectural competition:

- 1964 - General Post Office and Ministry of Telecommunication, Adis Abeba, Ethiopia (with Z. Kovačević) - 1. place
- 1973 - National Opera in Sofia, Bulgaria (with H. Muhasilović) - 1. place
- 1987 - The Great Mosque in Oran, Algeria (with H. Muhasilović) - 1. place

He has exhibited both at home in Yugoslavia and on the international scene. In 1973/74 he held personal exhibitions in Sarajevo, Belgrade, Ljubljana, Skopje and Zagreb. In 1986/87 a retrospective exhibition took stock of his work through 25 years work in Sarajevo, Skopje, Belgrade, Ljubljana and Novi Sad. He was a frequent participant in collective architectural exhibitions: “Yugoslav Architecture 1977-1984” in New York, “11 Prominent Architects of Yugoslavia” in Belgrade and “Architects-Academics of Bosnia and Herzegovina” in Sarajevo, Zagreb, Budapest and Maribor.

In 1965 Štraus was awarded by the City of Sarajevo April 6th Award; in 1978 he received the Award of the Republic of Bosnia and Herzegovina for his architectural oeuvre; in 1990 he got the BORBA Federal Award for the best architectural achievement in Yugoslavia in the previous year - the Museum of Aviation in Belgrade.

Since 1984 he was corresponding member and since 1995 regular member of the Academy of Sciences and Arts of Bosnia and Herzegovina. In 2012, he became the foreign member of Serbian Academy of Sciences and Arts.

He also issued a series of scientific books and articles on architecture, among others:

- New Architecture of Bosnia and Herzegovina, 1977
- "The Architecture of the twentieth century" in the edition of Art in Yugoslavia, 1987
- 15 Years of Bosnian and Herzegovinian Architecture, 1987.
- The Architecture of Yugoslavia 1945-1990, 1991.
- The Architect and the Barbarians (memoirs, published in Bosnian and French), 1995.
- Architecture of Bosnia and Herzegovina 1945-1995, 1998
- Ivan Štraus, architect/‘52-’02, ANUBiH, 2002
- 99 Architects of Sarajevo Circle 1930-1990, 2010

=== Reception ===
In 1984 the Academician Husref Redžić from Sarajevo wrote about Štraus, for the proposal for candidacy for his election to the Academy of Sciences of BiH :

"Ivan Strauss is a complete architectural and artistic personality, he is primarily a man of ideas and a creator of space, but he is an architect-builder and architect-publicist. ... The objects that Ivan Štraus designed recently, in the years of mature architectural activities, represent a small anthology of specific forms - pure in their geometry, powerful in their proportions, playful but disciplined in their rhythmic compositions and very often bold in constructive solutions. It is in the period of his maturity as an artist, the forms of his objects are increasingly bold, perfection of detail an increasingly accentuated, artistic vocabulary that shapes its world of architecture all the more richly."

Professor Nedžad Kurto, architect, wrote for "Odjek" No. 23, Sarajevo, 1986:

"Never burdened with a side effect, every architectural task solves exclusively at the level of intellectual and cognitive approach. Therefore, Štraus' architecture can not be loved or disliked, liked to like to like it, to discover and interpret it in its richness of thought expression. Today one of the most prominent representatives of contemporary Yugoslav architecture, and his previous work is certainly a significant contribution to contemporary architecture in general. "

About Štraus' Sacral Architecture, architect Mihajlo Mitrović writes:

"This whole cycle of unreleased and original artistic circles has a perfectly recognizable common denominator: complete beaconnamentality, masterly shaped lapidity of the form, and the sovereign presence of primary structures, which form the basis of the most unusual corners, dosed sacral mysteries. The bells are a special storie, a pure Euclidean planimetry, and the interpretation of the cross, a lucid challenge to the oldest and simplest symbol of Christ. Elem, the Strauss cycle of sacred architecture is obscured by unusual beauty, every beauty is an event, and the most lasting one is embedded in the Neymar style. "
