= Il Kal Grande =

Synagogue in Sarajevo, Bosnia and Herzegovina

Il Kal Grande Il Kal Grandi
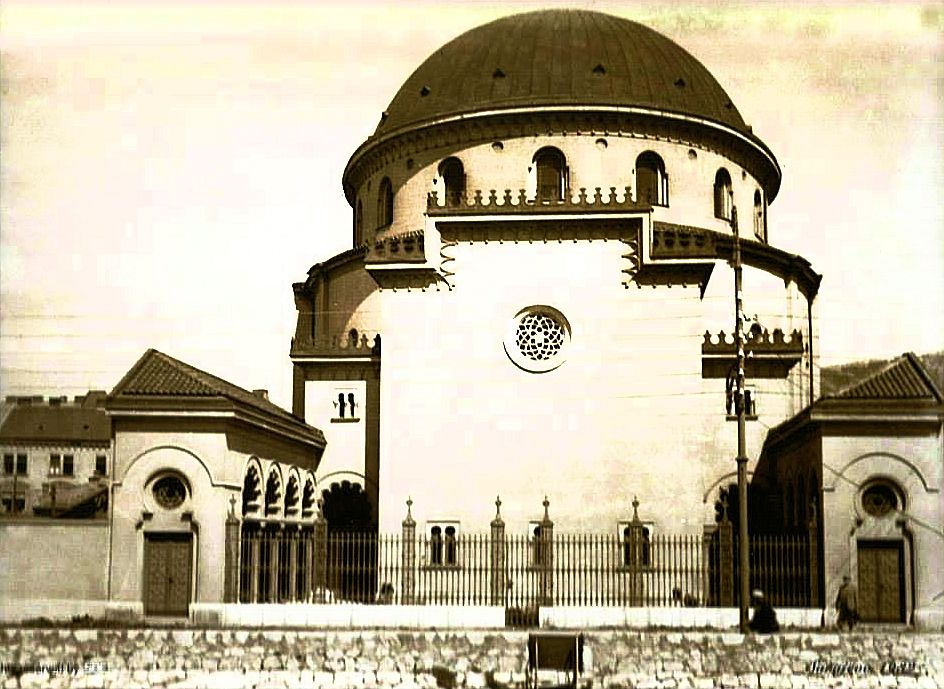
- The former synagogue, in c. 1930s – c. 1940s

- Location in Bosnia and Herzegovina Il Kal Grande (Sarajevo)

Religion
- Affiliation: Orthodox Judaism (former)
- Ecclesiastical or organizational status: Synagogue (1930–1941); University (1965–1993); Cultural center (since 1993)
- Ownership: Bosnian Cultural Center
- Status: Closed (as a synagogue); Repurposed

Location
- Location: Sarajevo
- Country: Bosnia and Herzegovina
- Interactive map of Il Kal Grande; Il Kal Grandi
- Coordinates: 43°51′26″N 18°25′19″E

Architecture
- Architect: Rudolf Lubinski
- Type: Synagogue architecture
- Style: Moorish Revival
- Completed: 1930
- Construction cost: YUM18 million
- Destroyed: 16 April 1941 (partial)

Specifications
- Capacity: 1,000 worshipers
- Dome: One
- Dome height (outer): 36 metres (118 ft)
- Designated as NHL

KONS of Bosnia and Herzegovina
- Official name: Il Kal Grande, the historic monument
- Type: Category II cultural property
- Designated: November 10, 2003 (decision No. 06-6-977/03-3)
- Reference no.: 114
- National Monument of Bosnia and Herzegovina
- Location of the building in local neighborhood

Il Kal Grande, also spelled Il Kal Grandi (Judaeo-Spanish: The Great Synagogue), is a former Orthodox Jewish congregation and synagogue, located in Sarajevo, Bosnia and Herzegovina. The congregation worshiped in the Sephardi rite. The building has been used as a cultural center since 1946.

== History ==
The large synagogue was constructed in the Moorish Revival style in 1930, by a design of the architect Rudolf Lubinski. It was the largest and most ornate synagogue in the Balkans. It included a large, ornately decorated prayer-hall, a smaller prayer-hall for use during the week, a genizah, rooms for the rabbi and various other utilities since the building was meant to serve not only as a synagogue, but also as a community center. The building was consecrated in 1930 in a ceremony attended by the chief rabbi of Yugoslavia Dr. Isaac Alcalay, chief Sephardic rabbi of Sarajevo Dr. Moritz Levy and chief Ashkenazi rabbi of Sarajevo Dr. Hinko Urbach, among others.

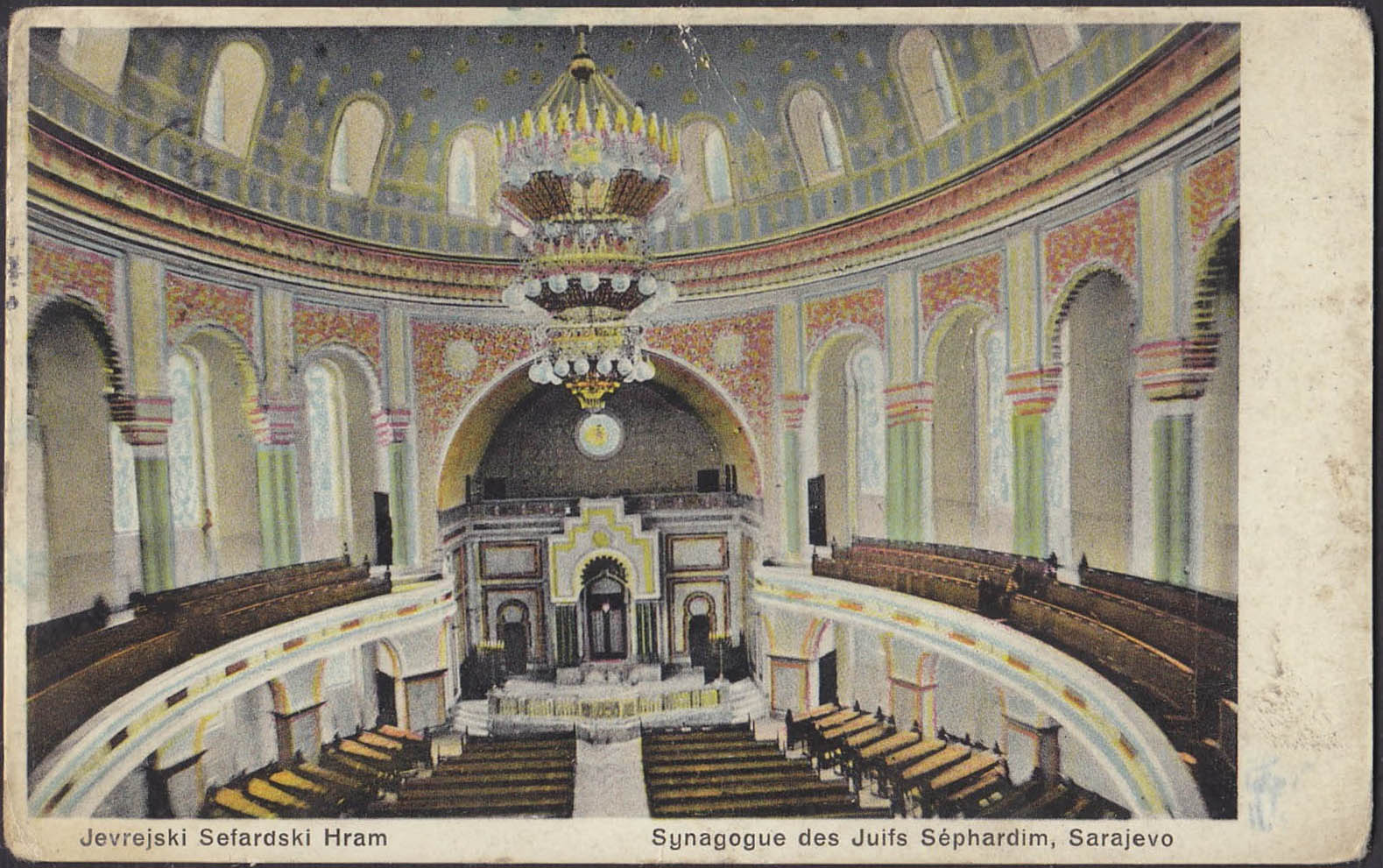
Interior of Il Kal Grande c. 1930

The building was heavily damaged and looted by the Nazis in 1941 during World War II, with the majority of the Jewish community being murdered in the Holocaust.

After WWII, all of the Jews in Sarajevo ended up using the Sarajevo Synagogue, the synagogue of the Ashkenazi community.

In 1946 Jewish community reached an agreement with the city's new government to donate the building to the City of Sarajevo, which was to be used exclusively for cultural purposes. The exterior of "Il Kal Grande" was restored in a simplified secular form in 1965, and the former dome was replaced with a flat roof. The building was initially used as the Đuro Đaković Workers University Center and is in use currently as the Bosnian Cultural Center.

== See also ==
- Jews in Bosnia and Herzegovina
- Sarajevo Haggadah
- List of synagogues in Bosnia and Herzegovina
