= Jewish Community of Doboj =

Community in Doboj, Bosnia and Herzegovina

See also History of the Jews in Bosnia and Herzegovina

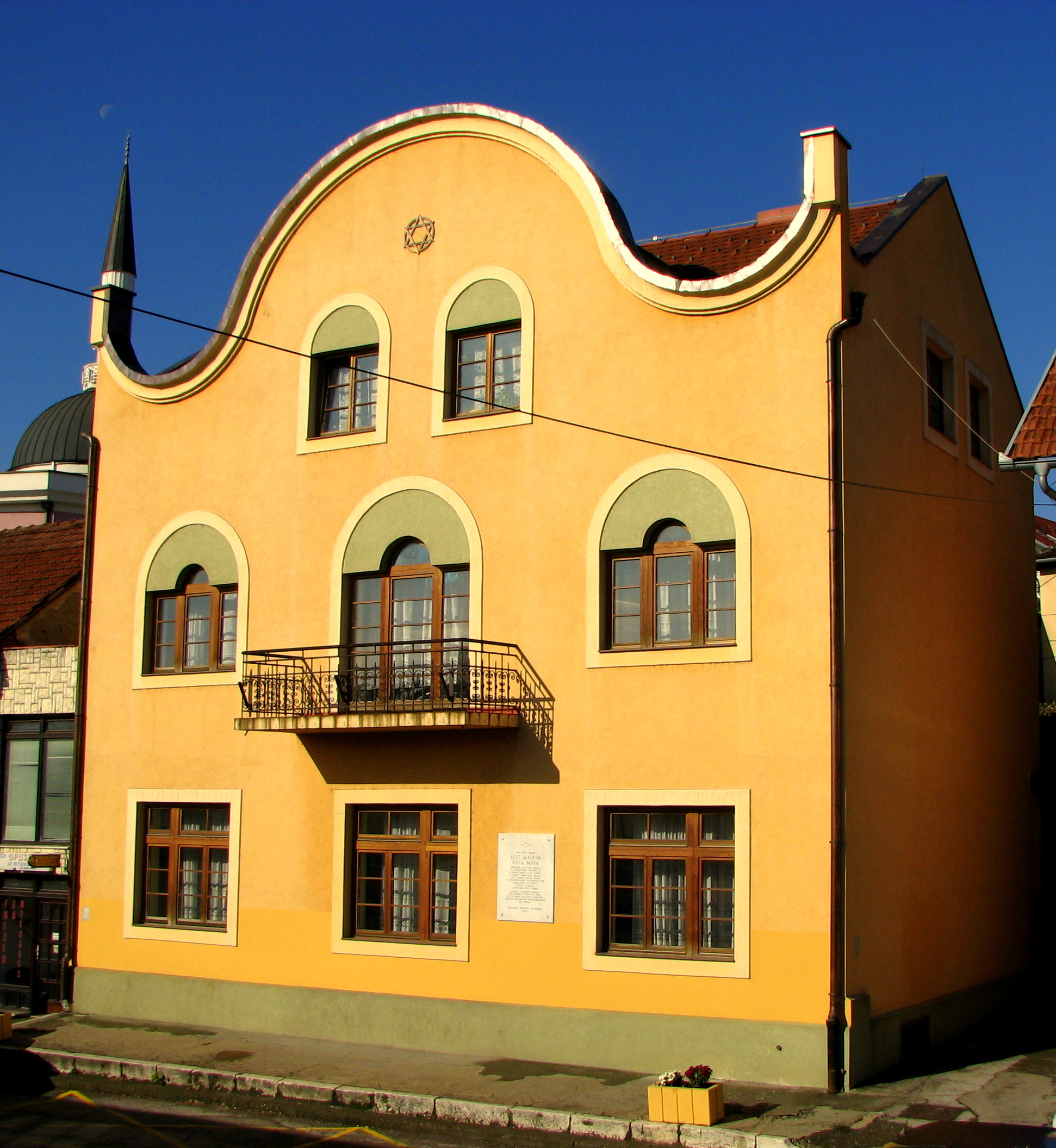
Synagogue in Doboj

The Jewish Community of Doboj (Bosnian language: Jevrejska opština u Doboju) is an organization representing the Jewish community in the city of Doboj, Bosnia and Herzegovina.

== History ==
The Jewish Community of Doboj was founded in 1871 and still exists to this day. In the 1940s, there were 24 Jewish communities in Bosnia and Herzegovina. Sarajevo, Tuzla and Banja Luka all had both Sephardic and Ashkenazi Jewish communities, while others had one joint community. Today, in addition to the community in Doboj, there are five remaining communities: Sarajevo, Banja Luka, Zenica, Tuzla and Mostar. The Jewish community numbers about 1,100 people. Synagogues exist in Sarajevo, Doboj and Banja Luka, while the construction of a synagogue in Mostar has been suspended due to legal battles over land ownership.

The relationship with the local community briefly soured when Mordechai Atijas, the community's president at that time, proclaimed himself as a "Jewish chetnik" and helped expel Bosnian Muslims from the town.

Many members of the community live in Doboj or in surrounding towns, including Teslić, Šamac and Derventa. The mission of the organization today is to preserve Jewish identity and traditions in Bosnia and Herzegovina, as well as promoting peace, cultural and economic cooperation among all citizens of the country. The Community receives funding from membership fees, the Jewish Social Fund, grants from the government ministries of Republika Srpska, the city of Doboj, and from donations.

The Jewish population of Doboj has increased through the years. In 1997, the Jewish population in Doboj was reported to be only 19 individuals. However, in 2005, this number rose to 40 people. In 2008, Balkan Insight reported a Jewish population of 100 members in the city.

== Synagogue in Doboj ==
The first synagogue in Doboj was built in 1874, but was destroyed in 1942 during the Second World War. Only the entrance door survived the destruction. Today that door stands in the courtyard of the new synagogue as a symbol of remembrance. The current synagogue was consecrated in 2003, with the community using a reconstructed family home from 1922 that originally belonged to Alexander Vrhovsky and Otto Kalamar. The community named the new synagogue "Bet Shalom". The site also includes a Jewish cultural center and the headquarters of the Jewish Community of Doboj. It was inaugurated in 2004.
