= Rudolf Lubinski =

Croatian architect (1873–1935)

- Born: 31 October 1873; Zagreb, Austro-Hungarian Monarchy, (now Croatia)
- Died: 27 March 1935 (aged 61); Zagreb, Kingdom of Yugoslavia

Rudolf Lubinski (also spelled Lubynski; 31 October 1873 – 27 March 1935) was a Croatian architect. Considered to be one of the greatest art nouveau Croatian architects, his most famous work is the Croatian State Archives building on Marulić Square in Zagreb.

== Biography ==
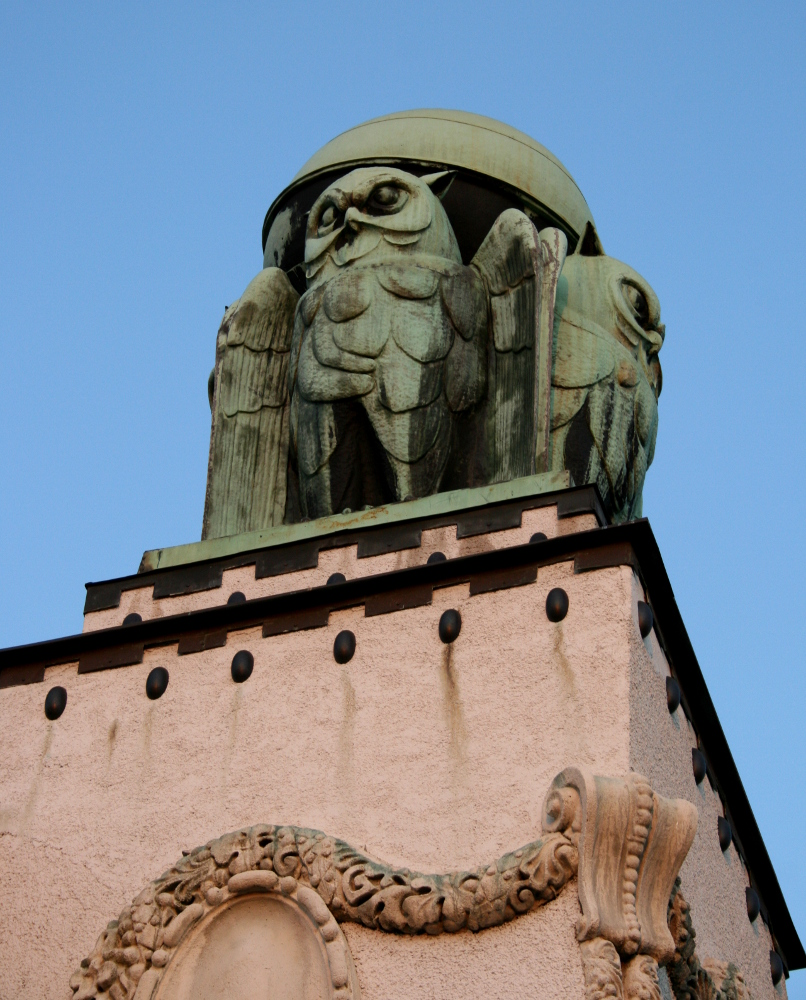
Detail from the building of the Croatian State Archives, designed by Lubinski.

Lubinski was born in Zagreb to a Croatian Jewish family Lubinski - Lövy. He studied at the Technische Hochschule university in Karlsruhe. After his education, he worked in the architectural studio of Josef Durm, participating in the city projects of Offenburg, Cologne, Karlsruhe and Freiburg. Lubinski has participated in developing the project for the Heidelberg University Library, which came as a particularly good experience gained in the later work in Zagreb.

In 1907, Lubinski created his own studio in Zagreb. He has designed numerous residential houses in Nazorova, Petrinjska and Masarykova street. Some of his major projects were, the Lutheran Center in the Gundulićeva street (1909), Svećenički dom (priests home) in Palmotićeva street (1910), and the building of the insurance company on Mihanovićeva street (1928). From 1911 until 1913, Lubinski worked on his biggest building project, the National and University Library on Marulić Square in Zagreb. From 1926 until 1930, he worked on a project for the Jewish synagogue in Sarajevo, Il Kal grandi. Lubinski's last project was a commercial building on Gajeva street 5.

There were many architects employed in Lubinski's studio, many of whom have since grown into the big names of Zagreb modern architecture, including Stjepan Planić, Stjepan Gomboš, and Juraj Neidhardt.

Lubinski died in Zagreb on 27 March 1935, and was buried at the Mirogoj Cemetery.

== Bibliography ==
- Snješka Knežević, Aleksander Laslo (2011). Židovski Zagreb. Zagreb: AGM, Židovska općina Zagreb. ISBN 978-953-174-393-8.
